

30001–30100 

|-bgcolor=#E9E9E9
| 30001 ||  || — || January 8, 2000 || Socorro || LINEAR || EUN || align=right | 5.6 km || 
|-id=002 bgcolor=#fefefe
| 30002 ||  || — || January 4, 2000 || Kitt Peak || Spacewatch || — || align=right | 1.6 km || 
|-id=003 bgcolor=#E9E9E9
| 30003 ||  || — || January 5, 2000 || Socorro || LINEAR || — || align=right | 4.4 km || 
|-id=004 bgcolor=#fefefe
| 30004 Mikewilliams ||  ||  || January 30, 2000 || Catalina || CSS || NYS || align=right | 1.8 km || 
|-id=005 bgcolor=#fefefe
| 30005 Stevenchen ||  ||  || February 2, 2000 || Socorro || LINEAR || — || align=right | 1.8 km || 
|-id=006 bgcolor=#d6d6d6
| 30006 ||  || — || February 2, 2000 || Socorro || LINEAR || KOR || align=right | 6.2 km || 
|-id=007 bgcolor=#fefefe
| 30007 Johnclarke ||  ||  || February 2, 2000 || Socorro || LINEAR || — || align=right | 4.1 km || 
|-id=008 bgcolor=#fefefe
| 30008 Aroncoraor ||  ||  || February 2, 2000 || Socorro || LINEAR || NYS || align=right | 2.2 km || 
|-id=009 bgcolor=#E9E9E9
| 30009 ||  || — || February 2, 2000 || Socorro || LINEAR || — || align=right | 4.1 km || 
|-id=010 bgcolor=#E9E9E9
| 30010 ||  || — || February 4, 2000 || Socorro || LINEAR || — || align=right | 5.9 km || 
|-id=011 bgcolor=#fefefe
| 30011 ||  || — || February 4, 2000 || Socorro || LINEAR || FLO || align=right | 2.1 km || 
|-id=012 bgcolor=#fefefe
| 30012 Sohamdaga ||  ||  || February 6, 2000 || Socorro || LINEAR || — || align=right | 3.4 km || 
|-id=013 bgcolor=#fefefe
| 30013 ||  || — || February 7, 2000 || Kitt Peak || Spacewatch || — || align=right | 2.1 km || 
|-id=014 bgcolor=#fefefe
| 30014 ||  || — || February 11, 2000 || Oaxaca || J. M. Roe || — || align=right | 1.9 km || 
|-id=015 bgcolor=#fefefe
| 30015 ||  || — || February 6, 2000 || Socorro || LINEAR || — || align=right | 2.0 km || 
|-id=016 bgcolor=#fefefe
| 30016 ||  || — || February 8, 2000 || Socorro || LINEAR || NYS || align=right | 8.1 km || 
|-id=017 bgcolor=#fefefe
| 30017 Shaundatta ||  ||  || February 10, 2000 || Socorro || LINEAR || EUT || align=right | 3.6 km || 
|-id=018 bgcolor=#fefefe
| 30018 ||  || — || February 14, 2000 || Uccle || T. Pauwels || — || align=right | 3.1 km || 
|-id=019 bgcolor=#fefefe
| 30019 || 2000 DD || — || February 16, 2000 || Socorro || LINEAR || H || align=right | 2.4 km || 
|-id=020 bgcolor=#C2FFFF
| 30020 ||  || — || February 28, 2000 || Socorro || LINEAR || L4 || align=right | 22 km || 
|-id=021 bgcolor=#fefefe
| 30021 ||  || — || February 28, 2000 || Socorro || LINEAR || — || align=right | 2.2 km || 
|-id=022 bgcolor=#fefefe
| 30022 Kathibaker ||  ||  || February 26, 2000 || Catalina || CSS || NYS || align=right | 4.2 km || 
|-id=023 bgcolor=#fefefe
| 30023 ||  || — || February 29, 2000 || Višnjan Observatory || K. Korlević || NYS || align=right | 1.7 km || 
|-id=024 bgcolor=#fefefe
| 30024 Neildavey ||  ||  || February 29, 2000 || Socorro || LINEAR || — || align=right | 4.4 km || 
|-id=025 bgcolor=#fefefe
| 30025 Benfreed ||  ||  || February 29, 2000 || Socorro || LINEAR || FLO || align=right | 1.8 km || 
|-id=026 bgcolor=#fefefe
| 30026 ||  || — || February 29, 2000 || Višnjan Observatory || K. Korlević || — || align=right | 4.6 km || 
|-id=027 bgcolor=#E9E9E9
| 30027 Anubhavguha ||  ||  || February 29, 2000 || Socorro || LINEAR || — || align=right | 1.8 km || 
|-id=028 bgcolor=#fefefe
| 30028 Yushihomma ||  ||  || February 29, 2000 || Socorro || LINEAR || MAS || align=right | 2.7 km || 
|-id=029 bgcolor=#fefefe
| 30029 Preetikakani ||  ||  || February 29, 2000 || Socorro || LINEAR || ERI || align=right | 3.9 km || 
|-id=030 bgcolor=#fefefe
| 30030 Joycekang ||  ||  || February 29, 2000 || Socorro || LINEAR || NYS || align=right | 1.5 km || 
|-id=031 bgcolor=#fefefe
| 30031 Angelakong ||  ||  || February 29, 2000 || Socorro || LINEAR || — || align=right | 2.8 km || 
|-id=032 bgcolor=#fefefe
| 30032 Kuszmaul ||  ||  || February 29, 2000 || Socorro || LINEAR || MAS || align=right | 1.5 km || 
|-id=033 bgcolor=#fefefe
| 30033 Kevinlee ||  ||  || February 29, 2000 || Socorro || LINEAR || — || align=right | 1.7 km || 
|-id=034 bgcolor=#fefefe
| 30034 ||  || — || February 29, 2000 || Socorro || LINEAR || — || align=right | 1.6 km || 
|-id=035 bgcolor=#E9E9E9
| 30035 Charlesliu ||  ||  || February 29, 2000 || Socorro || LINEAR || — || align=right | 2.3 km || 
|-id=036 bgcolor=#fefefe
| 30036 Eshamaiti ||  ||  || February 29, 2000 || Socorro || LINEAR || NYS || align=right | 1.6 km || 
|-id=037 bgcolor=#fefefe
| 30037 Rahulmehta ||  ||  || February 29, 2000 || Socorro || LINEAR || — || align=right | 2.4 km || 
|-id=038 bgcolor=#fefefe
| 30038 ||  || — || February 27, 2000 || Kitt Peak || Spacewatch || EUT || align=right | 2.0 km || 
|-id=039 bgcolor=#fefefe
| 30039 Jameier ||  ||  || February 29, 2000 || Socorro || LINEAR || NYS || align=right | 3.1 km || 
|-id=040 bgcolor=#fefefe
| 30040 Annemerrill ||  ||  || February 29, 2000 || Socorro || LINEAR || — || align=right | 5.3 km || 
|-id=041 bgcolor=#E9E9E9
| 30041 ||  || — || March 3, 2000 || Socorro || LINEAR || — || align=right | 3.2 km || 
|-id=042 bgcolor=#fefefe
| 30042 Schmude ||  ||  || March 1, 2000 || Catalina || CSS || FLO || align=right | 3.3 km || 
|-id=043 bgcolor=#fefefe
| 30043 Lisamichaels ||  ||  || March 3, 2000 || Socorro || LINEAR || — || align=right | 3.4 km || 
|-id=044 bgcolor=#fefefe
| 30044 ||  || — || March 5, 2000 || Socorro || LINEAR || — || align=right | 1.7 km || 
|-id=045 bgcolor=#fefefe
| 30045 ||  || — || March 6, 2000 || Višnjan Observatory || K. Korlević || NYS || align=right | 1.9 km || 
|-id=046 bgcolor=#fefefe
| 30046 ||  || — || March 8, 2000 || Kitt Peak || Spacewatch || EUT || align=right | 2.1 km || 
|-id=047 bgcolor=#E9E9E9
| 30047 ||  || — || March 8, 2000 || Socorro || LINEAR || ADE || align=right | 9.9 km || 
|-id=048 bgcolor=#fefefe
| 30048 Sreyasmisra ||  ||  || March 8, 2000 || Socorro || LINEAR || NYS || align=right | 1.8 km || 
|-id=049 bgcolor=#fefefe
| 30049 Violamocz ||  ||  || March 8, 2000 || Socorro || LINEAR || — || align=right | 7.1 km || 
|-id=050 bgcolor=#fefefe
| 30050 Emilypang ||  ||  || March 8, 2000 || Socorro || LINEAR || V || align=right | 2.0 km || 
|-id=051 bgcolor=#d6d6d6
| 30051 Jihopark ||  ||  || March 8, 2000 || Socorro || LINEAR || — || align=right | 6.6 km || 
|-id=052 bgcolor=#fefefe
| 30052 ||  || — || March 8, 2000 || Socorro || LINEAR || — || align=right | 6.2 km || 
|-id=053 bgcolor=#fefefe
| 30053 Ivanpaskov ||  ||  || March 9, 2000 || Socorro || LINEAR || — || align=right | 1.5 km || 
|-id=054 bgcolor=#fefefe
| 30054 Pereira ||  ||  || March 9, 2000 || Socorro || LINEAR || — || align=right | 2.4 km || 
|-id=055 bgcolor=#fefefe
| 30055 Ajaysaini ||  ||  || March 9, 2000 || Socorro || LINEAR || NYS || align=right | 1.8 km || 
|-id=056 bgcolor=#fefefe
| 30056 ||  || — || March 9, 2000 || Socorro || LINEAR || FLO || align=right | 2.5 km || 
|-id=057 bgcolor=#fefefe
| 30057 Sarasakowitz ||  ||  || March 8, 2000 || Socorro || LINEAR || NYS || align=right | 2.2 km || 
|-id=058 bgcolor=#fefefe
| 30058 ||  || — || March 8, 2000 || Socorro || LINEAR || — || align=right | 7.0 km || 
|-id=059 bgcolor=#fefefe
| 30059 ||  || — || March 10, 2000 || Socorro || LINEAR || — || align=right | 1.4 km || 
|-id=060 bgcolor=#fefefe
| 30060 Davidseong ||  ||  || March 10, 2000 || Socorro || LINEAR || NYS || align=right | 1.4 km || 
|-id=061 bgcolor=#fefefe
| 30061 Vishnushankar ||  ||  || March 10, 2000 || Socorro || LINEAR || — || align=right | 3.4 km || 
|-id=062 bgcolor=#fefefe
| 30062 ||  || — || March 10, 2000 || Socorro || LINEAR || — || align=right | 5.3 km || 
|-id=063 bgcolor=#fefefe
| 30063 Jessicashi ||  ||  || March 10, 2000 || Socorro || LINEAR || — || align=right | 1.8 km || 
|-id=064 bgcolor=#E9E9E9
| 30064 Kaitlynshin ||  ||  || March 10, 2000 || Socorro || LINEAR || — || align=right | 2.7 km || 
|-id=065 bgcolor=#fefefe
| 30065 Asrinivasan ||  ||  || March 10, 2000 || Socorro || LINEAR || FLO || align=right | 1.8 km || 
|-id=066 bgcolor=#fefefe
| 30066 Parthakker ||  ||  || March 10, 2000 || Socorro || LINEAR || V || align=right | 1.8 km || 
|-id=067 bgcolor=#fefefe
| 30067 Natalieng ||  ||  || March 10, 2000 || Socorro || LINEAR || V || align=right | 1.9 km || 
|-id=068 bgcolor=#E9E9E9
| 30068 Frankmelillo ||  ||  || March 11, 2000 || Catalina || CSS || GEF || align=right | 4.2 km || 
|-id=069 bgcolor=#fefefe
| 30069 ||  || — || March 10, 2000 || Kitt Peak || Spacewatch || V || align=right | 1.3 km || 
|-id=070 bgcolor=#fefefe
| 30070 Thabitpulak ||  ||  || March 8, 2000 || Socorro || LINEAR || — || align=right | 1.8 km || 
|-id=071 bgcolor=#E9E9E9
| 30071 ||  || — || March 9, 2000 || Socorro || LINEAR || EUN || align=right | 3.1 km || 
|-id=072 bgcolor=#E9E9E9
| 30072 ||  || — || March 9, 2000 || Socorro || LINEAR || EUN || align=right | 6.1 km || 
|-id=073 bgcolor=#fefefe
| 30073 Erichen ||  ||  || March 9, 2000 || Socorro || LINEAR || FLO || align=right | 3.6 km || 
|-id=074 bgcolor=#E9E9E9
| 30074 ||  || — || March 10, 2000 || Socorro || LINEAR || — || align=right | 9.5 km || 
|-id=075 bgcolor=#E9E9E9
| 30075 ||  || — || March 10, 2000 || Socorro || LINEAR || EUN || align=right | 4.2 km || 
|-id=076 bgcolor=#d6d6d6
| 30076 ||  || — || March 10, 2000 || Socorro || LINEAR || — || align=right | 7.5 km || 
|-id=077 bgcolor=#d6d6d6
| 30077 ||  || — || March 10, 2000 || Socorro || LINEAR || — || align=right | 6.2 km || 
|-id=078 bgcolor=#d6d6d6
| 30078 ||  || — || March 14, 2000 || Socorro || LINEAR || — || align=right | 8.5 km || 
|-id=079 bgcolor=#fefefe
| 30079 ||  || — || March 15, 2000 || Reedy Creek || J. Broughton || — || align=right | 2.7 km || 
|-id=080 bgcolor=#E9E9E9
| 30080 Walterworman ||  ||  || March 11, 2000 || Anderson Mesa || LONEOS || EUN || align=right | 2.9 km || 
|-id=081 bgcolor=#fefefe
| 30081 Zarinrahman ||  ||  || March 8, 2000 || Socorro || LINEAR || FLO || align=right | 3.1 km || 
|-id=082 bgcolor=#fefefe
| 30082 ||  || — || March 8, 2000 || Haleakala || NEAT || FLO || align=right | 3.7 km || 
|-id=083 bgcolor=#fefefe
| 30083 ||  || — || March 8, 2000 || Haleakala || NEAT || V || align=right | 2.7 km || 
|-id=084 bgcolor=#fefefe
| 30084 ||  || — || March 8, 2000 || Haleakala || NEAT || — || align=right | 2.1 km || 
|-id=085 bgcolor=#fefefe
| 30085 Kevingarbe ||  ||  || March 9, 2000 || Socorro || LINEAR || — || align=right | 2.0 km || 
|-id=086 bgcolor=#fefefe
| 30086 ||  || — || March 9, 2000 || Socorro || LINEAR || — || align=right | 4.2 km || 
|-id=087 bgcolor=#fefefe
| 30087 Georgeputnam ||  ||  || March 11, 2000 || Anderson Mesa || LONEOS || FLO || align=right | 1.8 km || 
|-id=088 bgcolor=#fefefe
| 30088 Deprá ||  ||  || March 11, 2000 || Anderson Mesa || LONEOS || NYS || align=right | 7.2 km || 
|-id=089 bgcolor=#E9E9E9
| 30089 Terikelley ||  ||  || March 11, 2000 || Anderson Mesa || LONEOS || — || align=right | 4.0 km || 
|-id=090 bgcolor=#E9E9E9
| 30090 Grossano ||  ||  || March 11, 2000 || Anderson Mesa || LONEOS || — || align=right | 5.4 km || 
|-id=091 bgcolor=#fefefe
| 30091 Stephenbrown ||  ||  || March 11, 2000 || Anderson Mesa || LONEOS || — || align=right | 1.9 km || 
|-id=092 bgcolor=#fefefe
| 30092 Menke ||  ||  || March 11, 2000 || Anderson Mesa || LONEOS || NYS || align=right | 5.7 km || 
|-id=093 bgcolor=#E9E9E9
| 30093 McClanahan ||  ||  || March 11, 2000 || Anderson Mesa || LONEOS || JUN || align=right | 4.3 km || 
|-id=094 bgcolor=#fefefe
| 30094 Rolfebode ||  ||  || March 2, 2000 || Catalina || CSS || — || align=right | 3.4 km || 
|-id=095 bgcolor=#fefefe
| 30095 Tarabode ||  ||  || March 3, 2000 || Catalina || CSS || FLO || align=right | 2.8 km || 
|-id=096 bgcolor=#fefefe
| 30096 Glindadavidson ||  ||  || March 4, 2000 || Catalina || CSS || NYS || align=right | 2.1 km || 
|-id=097 bgcolor=#fefefe
| 30097 Traino ||  ||  || March 4, 2000 || Catalina || CSS || V || align=right | 2.4 km || 
|-id=098 bgcolor=#fefefe
| 30098 ||  || — || March 5, 2000 || Haleakala || NEAT || NYS || align=right | 3.3 km || 
|-id=099 bgcolor=#E9E9E9
| 30099 ||  || — || March 5, 2000 || Haleakala || NEAT || — || align=right | 8.5 km || 
|-id=100 bgcolor=#E9E9E9
| 30100 Christophergo ||  ||  || March 11, 2000 || Catalina || CSS || — || align=right | 4.0 km || 
|}

30101–30200 

|-bgcolor=#fefefe
| 30101 || 2000 FA || — || March 16, 2000 || Socorro || LINEAR || — || align=right | 2.8 km || 
|-id=102 bgcolor=#C2FFFF
| 30102 ||  || — || March 26, 2000 || Socorro || LINEAR || L4 || align=right | 36 km || 
|-id=103 bgcolor=#fefefe
| 30103 ||  || — || March 28, 2000 || Oaxaca || J. M. Roe || NYS || align=right | 3.8 km || 
|-id=104 bgcolor=#fefefe
| 30104 ||  || — || March 27, 2000 || Gekko || T. Kagawa || — || align=right | 2.5 km || 
|-id=105 bgcolor=#FA8072
| 30105 ||  || — || March 28, 2000 || Socorro || LINEAR || — || align=right | 3.9 km || 
|-id=106 bgcolor=#E9E9E9
| 30106 ||  || — || March 28, 2000 || Socorro || LINEAR || — || align=right | 4.8 km || 
|-id=107 bgcolor=#fefefe
| 30107 ||  || — || March 28, 2000 || Socorro || LINEAR || V || align=right | 2.2 km || 
|-id=108 bgcolor=#E9E9E9
| 30108 ||  || — || March 28, 2000 || Socorro || LINEAR || — || align=right | 4.5 km || 
|-id=109 bgcolor=#fefefe
| 30109 Jaywilson ||  ||  || March 29, 2000 || Socorro || LINEAR || V || align=right | 2.0 km || 
|-id=110 bgcolor=#fefefe
| 30110 Lisabreton ||  ||  || March 29, 2000 || Socorro || LINEAR || — || align=right | 5.0 km || 
|-id=111 bgcolor=#fefefe
| 30111 Wendyslijk ||  ||  || March 29, 2000 || Socorro || LINEAR || V || align=right | 2.2 km || 
|-id=112 bgcolor=#fefefe
| 30112 Weistrop ||  ||  || March 27, 2000 || Anderson Mesa || LONEOS || V || align=right | 4.5 km || 
|-id=113 bgcolor=#fefefe
| 30113 ||  || — || March 27, 2000 || Anderson Mesa || LONEOS || FLO || align=right | 2.8 km || 
|-id=114 bgcolor=#fefefe
| 30114 ||  || — || March 27, 2000 || Anderson Mesa || LONEOS || — || align=right | 1.8 km || 
|-id=115 bgcolor=#fefefe
| 30115 ||  || — || March 28, 2000 || Socorro || LINEAR || — || align=right | 5.7 km || 
|-id=116 bgcolor=#fefefe
| 30116 ||  || — || March 29, 2000 || Socorro || LINEAR || — || align=right | 6.7 km || 
|-id=117 bgcolor=#fefefe
| 30117 Childress ||  ||  || March 29, 2000 || Socorro || LINEAR || — || align=right | 2.6 km || 
|-id=118 bgcolor=#fefefe
| 30118 ||  || — || March 29, 2000 || Socorro || LINEAR || FLO || align=right | 2.6 km || 
|-id=119 bgcolor=#E9E9E9
| 30119 Lucamatone ||  ||  || March 29, 2000 || Socorro || LINEAR || — || align=right | 2.9 km || 
|-id=120 bgcolor=#fefefe
| 30120 ||  || — || March 29, 2000 || Socorro || LINEAR || ERI || align=right | 7.0 km || 
|-id=121 bgcolor=#fefefe
| 30121 ||  || — || March 29, 2000 || Socorro || LINEAR || — || align=right | 2.2 km || 
|-id=122 bgcolor=#fefefe
| 30122 Elschweitzer ||  ||  || March 29, 2000 || Socorro || LINEAR || — || align=right | 2.5 km || 
|-id=123 bgcolor=#fefefe
| 30123 Scottrippeon ||  ||  || March 29, 2000 || Socorro || LINEAR || FLO || align=right | 2.6 km || 
|-id=124 bgcolor=#fefefe
| 30124 ||  || — || March 29, 2000 || Socorro || LINEAR || — || align=right | 3.2 km || 
|-id=125 bgcolor=#fefefe
| 30125 Mikekiser ||  ||  || March 29, 2000 || Socorro || LINEAR || — || align=right | 3.1 km || 
|-id=126 bgcolor=#fefefe
| 30126 Haviland ||  ||  || March 29, 2000 || Socorro || LINEAR || V || align=right | 2.1 km || 
|-id=127 bgcolor=#fefefe
| 30127 ||  || — || March 29, 2000 || Socorro || LINEAR || — || align=right | 2.2 km || 
|-id=128 bgcolor=#fefefe
| 30128 Shannonbunch ||  ||  || March 29, 2000 || Socorro || LINEAR || — || align=right | 2.2 km || 
|-id=129 bgcolor=#fefefe
| 30129 Virmani ||  ||  || March 29, 2000 || Socorro || LINEAR || — || align=right | 1.8 km || 
|-id=130 bgcolor=#fefefe
| 30130 Jeandillman ||  ||  || March 29, 2000 || Socorro || LINEAR || — || align=right | 2.4 km || 
|-id=131 bgcolor=#fefefe
| 30131 ||  || — || March 29, 2000 || Socorro || LINEAR || — || align=right | 1.8 km || 
|-id=132 bgcolor=#d6d6d6
| 30132 ||  || — || March 29, 2000 || Socorro || LINEAR || — || align=right | 10 km || 
|-id=133 bgcolor=#fefefe
| 30133 ||  || — || March 29, 2000 || Socorro || LINEAR || — || align=right | 2.9 km || 
|-id=134 bgcolor=#E9E9E9
| 30134 ||  || — || March 30, 2000 || Socorro || LINEAR || MAR || align=right | 3.7 km || 
|-id=135 bgcolor=#E9E9E9
| 30135 ||  || — || March 30, 2000 || Socorro || LINEAR || EUN || align=right | 4.5 km || 
|-id=136 bgcolor=#E9E9E9
| 30136 Bakerfranke ||  ||  || March 29, 2000 || Socorro || LINEAR || — || align=right | 3.6 km || 
|-id=137 bgcolor=#fefefe
| 30137 ||  || — || March 27, 2000 || Anderson Mesa || LONEOS || — || align=right | 2.0 km || 
|-id=138 bgcolor=#fefefe
| 30138 ||  || — || March 26, 2000 || Anderson Mesa || LONEOS || — || align=right | 1.2 km || 
|-id=139 bgcolor=#fefefe
| 30139 ||  || — || April 5, 2000 || Socorro || LINEAR || PHO || align=right | 3.0 km || 
|-id=140 bgcolor=#fefefe
| 30140 Robpergolizzi ||  ||  || April 4, 2000 || Socorro || LINEAR || — || align=right | 2.2 km || 
|-id=141 bgcolor=#fefefe
| 30141 Nelvenzon ||  ||  || April 5, 2000 || Socorro || LINEAR || V || align=right | 2.9 km || 
|-id=142 bgcolor=#fefefe
| 30142 Debfrazier ||  ||  || April 5, 2000 || Socorro || LINEAR || — || align=right | 2.2 km || 
|-id=143 bgcolor=#E9E9E9
| 30143 ||  || — || April 5, 2000 || Socorro || LINEAR || EUN || align=right | 4.0 km || 
|-id=144 bgcolor=#fefefe
| 30144 Minubasu ||  ||  || April 5, 2000 || Socorro || LINEAR || — || align=right | 1.6 km || 
|-id=145 bgcolor=#fefefe
| 30145 ||  || — || April 5, 2000 || Socorro || LINEAR || — || align=right | 5.7 km || 
|-id=146 bgcolor=#d6d6d6
| 30146 Decandia ||  ||  || April 5, 2000 || Socorro || LINEAR || THM || align=right | 8.4 km || 
|-id=147 bgcolor=#fefefe
| 30147 Amyhammer ||  ||  || April 5, 2000 || Socorro || LINEAR || — || align=right | 3.0 km || 
|-id=148 bgcolor=#fefefe
| 30148 ||  || — || April 5, 2000 || Socorro || LINEAR || NYS || align=right | 2.4 km || 
|-id=149 bgcolor=#fefefe
| 30149 Kellyriedell ||  ||  || April 5, 2000 || Socorro || LINEAR || — || align=right | 2.0 km || 
|-id=150 bgcolor=#fefefe
| 30150 Laseminara ||  ||  || April 5, 2000 || Socorro || LINEAR || V || align=right | 2.7 km || 
|-id=151 bgcolor=#fefefe
| 30151 Susanoffner ||  ||  || April 5, 2000 || Socorro || LINEAR || V || align=right | 2.0 km || 
|-id=152 bgcolor=#fefefe
| 30152 Reneefallon ||  ||  || April 5, 2000 || Socorro || LINEAR || NYS || align=right | 6.0 km || 
|-id=153 bgcolor=#fefefe
| 30153 Ostrander ||  ||  || April 5, 2000 || Socorro || LINEAR || V || align=right | 1.5 km || 
|-id=154 bgcolor=#fefefe
| 30154 Christichil ||  ||  || April 5, 2000 || Socorro || LINEAR || — || align=right | 3.5 km || 
|-id=155 bgcolor=#fefefe
| 30155 Warmuth ||  ||  || April 5, 2000 || Socorro || LINEAR || — || align=right | 2.1 km || 
|-id=156 bgcolor=#fefefe
| 30156 ||  || — || April 5, 2000 || Socorro || LINEAR || — || align=right | 2.1 km || 
|-id=157 bgcolor=#fefefe
| 30157 Robertspira ||  ||  || April 5, 2000 || Socorro || LINEAR || NYS || align=right | 1.8 km || 
|-id=158 bgcolor=#d6d6d6
| 30158 Mabdulla ||  ||  || April 5, 2000 || Socorro || LINEAR || — || align=right | 5.4 km || 
|-id=159 bgcolor=#E9E9E9
| 30159 Behari ||  ||  || April 5, 2000 || Socorro || LINEAR || — || align=right | 2.2 km || 
|-id=160 bgcolor=#fefefe
| 30160 Danielbruce ||  ||  || April 5, 2000 || Socorro || LINEAR || NYS || align=right | 1.7 km || 
|-id=161 bgcolor=#fefefe
| 30161 Chrepta ||  ||  || April 5, 2000 || Socorro || LINEAR || NYS || align=right | 1.6 km || 
|-id=162 bgcolor=#fefefe
| 30162 Courtney ||  ||  || April 5, 2000 || Socorro || LINEAR || MAS || align=right | 2.7 km || 
|-id=163 bgcolor=#E9E9E9
| 30163 ||  || — || April 5, 2000 || Socorro || LINEAR || GEF || align=right | 4.1 km || 
|-id=164 bgcolor=#fefefe
| 30164 Arnobdas ||  ||  || April 5, 2000 || Socorro || LINEAR || — || align=right | 5.2 km || 
|-id=165 bgcolor=#E9E9E9
| 30165 ||  || — || April 5, 2000 || Socorro || LINEAR || — || align=right | 6.0 km || 
|-id=166 bgcolor=#fefefe
| 30166 Leodeng ||  ||  || April 5, 2000 || Socorro || LINEAR || — || align=right | 3.4 km || 
|-id=167 bgcolor=#fefefe
| 30167 Caredmonds ||  ||  || April 5, 2000 || Socorro || LINEAR || V || align=right | 2.3 km || 
|-id=168 bgcolor=#fefefe
| 30168 Linusfreyer ||  ||  || April 5, 2000 || Socorro || LINEAR || NYS || align=right | 2.4 km || 
|-id=169 bgcolor=#fefefe
| 30169 Raghavganesh ||  ||  || April 5, 2000 || Socorro || LINEAR || NYS || align=right | 2.0 km || 
|-id=170 bgcolor=#E9E9E9
| 30170 Makaylaruth ||  ||  || April 5, 2000 || Socorro || LINEAR || — || align=right | 2.4 km || 
|-id=171 bgcolor=#fefefe
| 30171 ||  || — || April 5, 2000 || Socorro || LINEAR || V || align=right | 2.9 km || 
|-id=172 bgcolor=#d6d6d6
| 30172 Giedraitis ||  ||  || April 5, 2000 || Socorro || LINEAR || KOR || align=right | 3.8 km || 
|-id=173 bgcolor=#fefefe
| 30173 Greenwood ||  ||  || April 5, 2000 || Socorro || LINEAR || — || align=right | 2.2 km || 
|-id=174 bgcolor=#fefefe
| 30174 Hollyjackson ||  ||  || April 5, 2000 || Socorro || LINEAR || — || align=right | 2.2 km || 
|-id=175 bgcolor=#E9E9E9
| 30175 Adityajain ||  ||  || April 5, 2000 || Socorro || LINEAR || — || align=right | 4.7 km || 
|-id=176 bgcolor=#fefefe
| 30176 Gelseyjaymes ||  ||  || April 5, 2000 || Socorro || LINEAR || V || align=right | 1.9 km || 
|-id=177 bgcolor=#fefefe
| 30177 Khashayar ||  ||  || April 5, 2000 || Socorro || LINEAR || V || align=right | 2.7 km || 
|-id=178 bgcolor=#fefefe
| 30178 ||  || — || April 5, 2000 || Socorro || LINEAR || — || align=right | 3.1 km || 
|-id=179 bgcolor=#fefefe
| 30179 Movva ||  ||  || April 6, 2000 || Socorro || LINEAR || — || align=right | 2.7 km || 
|-id=180 bgcolor=#E9E9E9
| 30180 ||  || — || April 4, 2000 || Socorro || LINEAR || — || align=right | 5.4 km || 
|-id=181 bgcolor=#E9E9E9
| 30181 ||  || — || April 4, 2000 || Socorro || LINEAR || — || align=right | 4.0 km || 
|-id=182 bgcolor=#E9E9E9
| 30182 ||  || — || April 6, 2000 || Socorro || LINEAR || EUN || align=right | 5.1 km || 
|-id=183 bgcolor=#fefefe
| 30183 Murali ||  ||  || April 6, 2000 || Socorro || LINEAR || — || align=right | 5.3 km || 
|-id=184 bgcolor=#fefefe
| 30184 Okasinski ||  ||  || April 6, 2000 || Socorro || LINEAR || V || align=right | 2.2 km || 
|-id=185 bgcolor=#E9E9E9
| 30185 ||  || — || April 6, 2000 || Socorro || LINEAR || — || align=right | 6.6 km || 
|-id=186 bgcolor=#E9E9E9
| 30186 Ostojic ||  ||  || April 6, 2000 || Socorro || LINEAR || — || align=right | 5.2 km || 
|-id=187 bgcolor=#fefefe
| 30187 Jamesroney ||  ||  || April 6, 2000 || Socorro || LINEAR || — || align=right | 2.8 km || 
|-id=188 bgcolor=#fefefe
| 30188 Hafsasaeed ||  ||  || April 6, 2000 || Socorro || LINEAR || — || align=right | 3.1 km || 
|-id=189 bgcolor=#E9E9E9
| 30189 ||  || — || April 6, 2000 || Socorro || LINEAR || — || align=right | 5.8 km || 
|-id=190 bgcolor=#fefefe
| 30190 Alexshelby ||  ||  || April 6, 2000 || Socorro || LINEAR || — || align=right | 6.3 km || 
|-id=191 bgcolor=#fefefe
| 30191 Sivakumar ||  ||  || April 7, 2000 || Socorro || LINEAR || — || align=right | 3.3 km || 
|-id=192 bgcolor=#fefefe
| 30192 Talarterzian ||  ||  || April 7, 2000 || Socorro || LINEAR || FLO || align=right | 3.0 km || 
|-id=193 bgcolor=#fefefe
| 30193 Annikaurban ||  ||  || April 7, 2000 || Socorro || LINEAR || V || align=right | 2.3 km || 
|-id=194 bgcolor=#fefefe
| 30194 Liamyoung ||  ||  || April 7, 2000 || Socorro || LINEAR || — || align=right | 3.1 km || 
|-id=195 bgcolor=#fefefe
| 30195 Akdemir ||  ||  || April 7, 2000 || Socorro || LINEAR || — || align=right | 2.7 km || 
|-id=196 bgcolor=#fefefe
| 30196 ||  || — || April 7, 2000 || Socorro || LINEAR || FLO || align=right | 2.2 km || 
|-id=197 bgcolor=#fefefe
| 30197 Nickbadyrka ||  ||  || April 7, 2000 || Socorro || LINEAR || — || align=right | 2.1 km || 
|-id=198 bgcolor=#fefefe
| 30198 ||  || — || April 7, 2000 || Socorro || LINEAR || — || align=right | 1.9 km || 
|-id=199 bgcolor=#fefefe
| 30199 Ericbrown ||  ||  || April 7, 2000 || Socorro || LINEAR || — || align=right | 1.8 km || 
|-id=200 bgcolor=#fefefe
| 30200 Terryburch ||  ||  || April 7, 2000 || Socorro || LINEAR || NYS || align=right | 2.5 km || 
|}

30201–30300 

|-bgcolor=#fefefe
| 30201 Caruana ||  ||  || April 7, 2000 || Socorro || LINEAR || — || align=right | 2.4 km || 
|-id=202 bgcolor=#E9E9E9
| 30202 ||  || — || April 7, 2000 || Socorro || LINEAR || — || align=right | 3.0 km || 
|-id=203 bgcolor=#fefefe
| 30203 Kimdavis ||  ||  || April 7, 2000 || Socorro || LINEAR || NYS || align=right | 2.2 km || 
|-id=204 bgcolor=#fefefe
| 30204 Stevedoherty ||  ||  || April 7, 2000 || Socorro || LINEAR || — || align=right | 3.1 km || 
|-id=205 bgcolor=#fefefe
| 30205 Mistyevans ||  ||  || April 7, 2000 || Socorro || LINEAR || — || align=right | 2.2 km || 
|-id=206 bgcolor=#E9E9E9
| 30206 Jasonfricker ||  ||  || April 7, 2000 || Socorro || LINEAR || — || align=right | 3.1 km || 
|-id=207 bgcolor=#E9E9E9
| 30207 ||  || — || April 7, 2000 || Socorro || LINEAR || — || align=right | 6.2 km || 
|-id=208 bgcolor=#fefefe
| 30208 Guigarcia ||  ||  || April 8, 2000 || Socorro || LINEAR || V || align=right | 2.0 km || 
|-id=209 bgcolor=#E9E9E9
| 30209 Garciaarriola ||  ||  || April 8, 2000 || Socorro || LINEAR || — || align=right | 3.2 km || 
|-id=210 bgcolor=#E9E9E9
| 30210 ||  || — || April 10, 2000 || Haleakala || NEAT || — || align=right | 3.2 km || 
|-id=211 bgcolor=#fefefe
| 30211 Sheilah ||  ||  || April 7, 2000 || Socorro || LINEAR || — || align=right | 3.3 km || 
|-id=212 bgcolor=#E9E9E9
| 30212 ||  || — || April 7, 2000 || Socorro || LINEAR || — || align=right | 4.5 km || 
|-id=213 bgcolor=#fefefe
| 30213 ||  || — || April 7, 2000 || Socorro || LINEAR || — || align=right | 3.9 km || 
|-id=214 bgcolor=#fefefe
| 30214 ||  || — || April 7, 2000 || Socorro || LINEAR || V || align=right | 3.2 km || 
|-id=215 bgcolor=#E9E9E9
| 30215 ||  || — || April 7, 2000 || Socorro || LINEAR || — || align=right | 4.7 km || 
|-id=216 bgcolor=#fefefe
| 30216 Summerjohnson ||  ||  || April 7, 2000 || Socorro || LINEAR || V || align=right | 2.5 km || 
|-id=217 bgcolor=#fefefe
| 30217 ||  || — || April 7, 2000 || Socorro || LINEAR || — || align=right | 4.2 km || 
|-id=218 bgcolor=#fefefe
| 30218 Paulaladd ||  ||  || April 7, 2000 || Socorro || LINEAR || FLO || align=right | 3.1 km || 
|-id=219 bgcolor=#d6d6d6
| 30219 ||  || — || April 7, 2000 || Socorro || LINEAR || Tj (2.97) || align=right | 12 km || 
|-id=220 bgcolor=#fefefe
| 30220 ||  || — || April 7, 2000 || Socorro || LINEAR || — || align=right | 3.4 km || 
|-id=221 bgcolor=#fefefe
| 30221 LeDonne ||  ||  || April 7, 2000 || Socorro || LINEAR || — || align=right | 3.0 km || 
|-id=222 bgcolor=#fefefe
| 30222 Malecki ||  ||  || April 7, 2000 || Socorro || LINEAR || — || align=right | 2.9 km || 
|-id=223 bgcolor=#E9E9E9
| 30223 ||  || — || April 7, 2000 || Socorro || LINEAR || DOR || align=right | 9.9 km || 
|-id=224 bgcolor=#E9E9E9
| 30224 ||  || — || April 12, 2000 || Socorro || LINEAR || — || align=right | 5.8 km || 
|-id=225 bgcolor=#d6d6d6
| 30225 Ellenzweibel ||  ||  || April 4, 2000 || Anderson Mesa || LONEOS || THM || align=right | 6.0 km || 
|-id=226 bgcolor=#fefefe
| 30226 ||  || — || April 4, 2000 || Anderson Mesa || LONEOS || FLO || align=right | 2.9 km || 
|-id=227 bgcolor=#E9E9E9
| 30227 ||  || — || April 4, 2000 || Anderson Mesa || LONEOS || — || align=right | 2.3 km || 
|-id=228 bgcolor=#E9E9E9
| 30228 Hushoucun ||  ||  || April 7, 2000 || Anderson Mesa || LONEOS || GEF || align=right | 4.6 km || 
|-id=229 bgcolor=#E9E9E9
| 30229 ||  || — || April 7, 2000 || Anderson Mesa || LONEOS || — || align=right | 3.8 km || 
|-id=230 bgcolor=#E9E9E9
| 30230 Ralucarufu ||  ||  || April 7, 2000 || Anderson Mesa || LONEOS || RAF || align=right | 2.8 km || 
|-id=231 bgcolor=#E9E9E9
| 30231 Patorojo ||  ||  || April 7, 2000 || Anderson Mesa || LONEOS || EUN || align=right | 4.0 km || 
|-id=232 bgcolor=#fefefe
| 30232 ||  || — || April 6, 2000 || Anderson Mesa || LONEOS || — || align=right | 2.4 km || 
|-id=233 bgcolor=#d6d6d6
| 30233 ||  || — || April 7, 2000 || Socorro || LINEAR || — || align=right | 8.4 km || 
|-id=234 bgcolor=#fefefe
| 30234 Dudziński ||  ||  || April 4, 2000 || Anderson Mesa || LONEOS || H || align=right | 1.4 km || 
|-id=235 bgcolor=#fefefe
| 30235 Kimmiller ||  ||  || April 5, 2000 || Socorro || LINEAR || V || align=right | 1.4 km || 
|-id=236 bgcolor=#E9E9E9
| 30236 || 2000 HF || — || April 23, 2000 || Kurohone || T. Kobayashi || — || align=right | 5.9 km || 
|-id=237 bgcolor=#fefefe
| 30237 ||  || — || April 25, 2000 || Višnjan Observatory || K. Korlević || V || align=right | 2.6 km || 
|-id=238 bgcolor=#d6d6d6
| 30238 ||  || — || April 27, 2000 || Socorro || LINEAR || EOS || align=right | 5.5 km || 
|-id=239 bgcolor=#E9E9E9
| 30239 ||  || — || April 27, 2000 || Socorro || LINEAR || MAR || align=right | 3.7 km || 
|-id=240 bgcolor=#E9E9E9
| 30240 Morgensen ||  ||  || April 27, 2000 || Socorro || LINEAR || — || align=right | 4.2 km || 
|-id=241 bgcolor=#fefefe
| 30241 Donnamower ||  ||  || April 27, 2000 || Socorro || LINEAR || — || align=right | 1.9 km || 
|-id=242 bgcolor=#fefefe
| 30242 Naymark ||  ||  || April 27, 2000 || Socorro || LINEAR || V || align=right | 2.1 km || 
|-id=243 bgcolor=#fefefe
| 30243 ||  || — || April 27, 2000 || Socorro || LINEAR || — || align=right | 1.8 km || 
|-id=244 bgcolor=#fefefe
| 30244 Linhpham ||  ||  || April 27, 2000 || Socorro || LINEAR || — || align=right | 2.8 km || 
|-id=245 bgcolor=#E9E9E9
| 30245 Paigesmith ||  ||  || April 28, 2000 || Socorro || LINEAR || — || align=right | 3.0 km || 
|-id=246 bgcolor=#E9E9E9
| 30246 ||  || — || April 28, 2000 || Socorro || LINEAR || — || align=right | 4.0 km || 
|-id=247 bgcolor=#d6d6d6
| 30247 ||  || — || April 28, 2000 || Socorro || LINEAR || THM || align=right | 9.6 km || 
|-id=248 bgcolor=#E9E9E9
| 30248 Kimstinson ||  ||  || April 28, 2000 || Socorro || LINEAR || — || align=right | 7.1 km || 
|-id=249 bgcolor=#fefefe
| 30249 Zamora ||  ||  || April 28, 2000 || Socorro || LINEAR || V || align=right | 2.8 km || 
|-id=250 bgcolor=#E9E9E9
| 30250 ||  || — || April 28, 2000 || Socorro || LINEAR || — || align=right | 7.4 km || 
|-id=251 bgcolor=#E9E9E9
| 30251 Ashkin ||  ||  || April 29, 2000 || Socorro || LINEAR || — || align=right | 2.4 km || 
|-id=252 bgcolor=#fefefe
| 30252 Textorisová ||  ||  || April 30, 2000 || Ondřejov || P. Kušnirák || — || align=right | 2.3 km || 
|-id=253 bgcolor=#fefefe
| 30253 Vítek ||  ||  || April 30, 2000 || Ondřejov || P. Kušnirák, P. Pravec || — || align=right | 2.0 km || 
|-id=254 bgcolor=#d6d6d6
| 30254 ||  || — || April 24, 2000 || Anderson Mesa || LONEOS || KOR || align=right | 3.5 km || 
|-id=255 bgcolor=#E9E9E9
| 30255 ||  || — || April 24, 2000 || Anderson Mesa || LONEOS || — || align=right | 2.4 km || 
|-id=256 bgcolor=#fefefe
| 30256 ||  || — || April 28, 2000 || Socorro || LINEAR || — || align=right | 2.3 km || 
|-id=257 bgcolor=#fefefe
| 30257 Leejanel ||  ||  || April 29, 2000 || Socorro || LINEAR || — || align=right | 2.9 km || 
|-id=258 bgcolor=#E9E9E9
| 30258 ||  || — || April 29, 2000 || Socorro || LINEAR || — || align=right | 5.0 km || 
|-id=259 bgcolor=#fefefe
| 30259 Catherineli ||  ||  || April 27, 2000 || Socorro || LINEAR || — || align=right | 2.3 km || 
|-id=260 bgcolor=#fefefe
| 30260 ||  || — || April 28, 2000 || Socorro || LINEAR || V || align=right | 2.7 km || 
|-id=261 bgcolor=#E9E9E9
| 30261 ||  || — || April 28, 2000 || Socorro || LINEAR || — || align=right | 3.7 km || 
|-id=262 bgcolor=#E9E9E9
| 30262 ||  || — || April 28, 2000 || Socorro || LINEAR || — || align=right | 8.4 km || 
|-id=263 bgcolor=#E9E9E9
| 30263 ||  || — || April 28, 2000 || Socorro || LINEAR || ADE || align=right | 8.0 km || 
|-id=264 bgcolor=#E9E9E9
| 30264 ||  || — || April 26, 2000 || Anderson Mesa || LONEOS || — || align=right | 2.5 km || 
|-id=265 bgcolor=#fefefe
| 30265 ||  || — || April 26, 2000 || Anderson Mesa || LONEOS || FLO || align=right | 1.9 km || 
|-id=266 bgcolor=#E9E9E9
| 30266 ||  || — || April 29, 2000 || Socorro || LINEAR || EUN || align=right | 3.8 km || 
|-id=267 bgcolor=#E9E9E9
| 30267 Raghuvanshi ||  ||  || April 29, 2000 || Socorro || LINEAR || — || align=right | 4.6 km || 
|-id=268 bgcolor=#E9E9E9
| 30268 Jessezhang ||  ||  || April 29, 2000 || Socorro || LINEAR || — || align=right | 2.9 km || 
|-id=269 bgcolor=#fefefe
| 30269 Anandapadmanaban ||  ||  || April 29, 2000 || Socorro || LINEAR || NYS || align=right | 2.2 km || 
|-id=270 bgcolor=#fefefe
| 30270 Chemparathy ||  ||  || April 29, 2000 || Socorro || LINEAR || NYS || align=right | 2.3 km || 
|-id=271 bgcolor=#fefefe
| 30271 Brandoncui ||  ||  || April 29, 2000 || Socorro || LINEAR || — || align=right | 1.8 km || 
|-id=272 bgcolor=#E9E9E9
| 30272 D'Mello ||  ||  || April 29, 2000 || Socorro || LINEAR || — || align=right | 3.9 km || 
|-id=273 bgcolor=#fefefe
| 30273 Samepstein ||  ||  || April 29, 2000 || Socorro || LINEAR || FLO || align=right | 2.0 km || 
|-id=274 bgcolor=#E9E9E9
| 30274 ||  || — || April 29, 2000 || Socorro || LINEAR || EUN || align=right | 5.1 km || 
|-id=275 bgcolor=#E9E9E9
| 30275 Eskow ||  ||  || April 29, 2000 || Socorro || LINEAR || — || align=right | 3.0 km || 
|-id=276 bgcolor=#E9E9E9
| 30276 Noahgolowich ||  ||  || April 29, 2000 || Socorro || LINEAR || — || align=right | 5.2 km || 
|-id=277 bgcolor=#fefefe
| 30277 Charlesgulian ||  ||  || April 29, 2000 || Socorro || LINEAR || — || align=right | 3.6 km || 
|-id=278 bgcolor=#d6d6d6
| 30278 ||  || — || April 24, 2000 || Anderson Mesa || LONEOS || KOR || align=right | 5.7 km || 
|-id=279 bgcolor=#fefefe
| 30279 ||  || — || April 24, 2000 || Anderson Mesa || LONEOS || — || align=right | 2.7 km || 
|-id=280 bgcolor=#E9E9E9
| 30280 ||  || — || April 24, 2000 || Anderson Mesa || LONEOS || — || align=right | 2.6 km || 
|-id=281 bgcolor=#fefefe
| 30281 Horstman ||  ||  || April 24, 2000 || Anderson Mesa || LONEOS || — || align=right | 2.5 km || 
|-id=282 bgcolor=#fefefe
| 30282 Jamessmith ||  ||  || April 24, 2000 || Anderson Mesa || LONEOS || V || align=right | 2.5 km || 
|-id=283 bgcolor=#fefefe
| 30283 Shirleysmith ||  ||  || April 24, 2000 || Anderson Mesa || LONEOS || V || align=right | 2.5 km || 
|-id=284 bgcolor=#fefefe
| 30284 ||  || — || April 24, 2000 || Kitt Peak || Spacewatch || EUT || align=right | 1.8 km || 
|-id=285 bgcolor=#d6d6d6
| 30285 ||  || — || April 25, 2000 || Anderson Mesa || LONEOS || — || align=right | 7.9 km || 
|-id=286 bgcolor=#d6d6d6
| 30286 ||  || — || April 25, 2000 || Anderson Mesa || LONEOS || KOR || align=right | 3.1 km || 
|-id=287 bgcolor=#E9E9E9
| 30287 ||  || — || April 25, 2000 || Kitt Peak || Spacewatch || AEO || align=right | 3.2 km || 
|-id=288 bgcolor=#E9E9E9
| 30288 ||  || — || April 26, 2000 || Anderson Mesa || LONEOS || HOF || align=right | 6.6 km || 
|-id=289 bgcolor=#fefefe
| 30289 ||  || — || April 26, 2000 || Anderson Mesa || LONEOS || FLO || align=right | 1.8 km || 
|-id=290 bgcolor=#fefefe
| 30290 ||  || — || April 24, 2000 || Anderson Mesa || LONEOS || — || align=right | 2.2 km || 
|-id=291 bgcolor=#E9E9E9
| 30291 ||  || — || April 24, 2000 || Anderson Mesa || LONEOS || — || align=right | 5.6 km || 
|-id=292 bgcolor=#fefefe
| 30292 ||  || — || April 26, 2000 || Anderson Mesa || LONEOS || — || align=right | 2.0 km || 
|-id=293 bgcolor=#E9E9E9
| 30293 ||  || — || April 26, 2000 || Anderson Mesa || LONEOS || — || align=right | 6.3 km || 
|-id=294 bgcolor=#fefefe
| 30294 ||  || — || April 27, 2000 || Socorro || LINEAR || — || align=right | 3.0 km || 
|-id=295 bgcolor=#E9E9E9
| 30295 Anvitagupta ||  ||  || April 27, 2000 || Socorro || LINEAR || — || align=right | 2.8 km || 
|-id=296 bgcolor=#E9E9E9
| 30296 Bricehuang ||  ||  || April 27, 2000 || Socorro || LINEAR || — || align=right | 2.9 km || 
|-id=297 bgcolor=#E9E9E9
| 30297 ||  || — || April 28, 2000 || Anderson Mesa || LONEOS || — || align=right | 5.0 km || 
|-id=298 bgcolor=#fefefe
| 30298 Somyakhare ||  ||  || April 29, 2000 || Socorro || LINEAR || — || align=right | 2.3 km || 
|-id=299 bgcolor=#fefefe
| 30299 Shashkishore ||  ||  || April 29, 2000 || Socorro || LINEAR || — || align=right | 4.7 km || 
|-id=300 bgcolor=#d6d6d6
| 30300 ||  || — || April 30, 2000 || Anderson Mesa || LONEOS || EOS || align=right | 5.3 km || 
|}

30301–30400 

|-bgcolor=#fefefe
| 30301 Kuditipudi ||  ||  || April 27, 2000 || Socorro || LINEAR || FLO || align=right | 2.4 km || 
|-id=302 bgcolor=#fefefe
| 30302 Kritilall ||  ||  || April 28, 2000 || Socorro || LINEAR || — || align=right | 2.4 km || 
|-id=303 bgcolor=#fefefe
| 30303 ||  || — || April 29, 2000 || Socorro || LINEAR || — || align=right | 2.3 km || 
|-id=304 bgcolor=#E9E9E9
| 30304 Denisvida ||  ||  || April 27, 2000 || Anderson Mesa || LONEOS || EUN || align=right | 2.8 km || 
|-id=305 bgcolor=#d6d6d6
| 30305 Severi || 2000 JA ||  || May 1, 2000 || Prescott || P. G. Comba || KOR || align=right | 4.4 km || 
|-id=306 bgcolor=#E9E9E9
| 30306 Frigyesriesz || 2000 JD ||  || May 2, 2000 || Prescott || P. G. Comba || — || align=right | 3.2 km || 
|-id=307 bgcolor=#d6d6d6
| 30307 Marcelriesz || 2000 JE ||  || May 2, 2000 || Prescott || P. G. Comba || — || align=right | 7.6 km || 
|-id=308 bgcolor=#fefefe
| 30308 Ienli ||  ||  || May 1, 2000 || Socorro || LINEAR || V || align=right | 1.8 km || 
|-id=309 bgcolor=#fefefe
| 30309 ||  || — || May 3, 2000 || Višnjan Observatory || K. Korlević || V || align=right | 3.2 km || 
|-id=310 bgcolor=#fefefe
| 30310 Alexanderlin ||  ||  || May 3, 2000 || Socorro || LINEAR || — || align=right | 2.6 km || 
|-id=311 bgcolor=#fefefe
| 30311 ||  || — || May 9, 2000 || Socorro || LINEAR || H || align=right | 3.6 km || 
|-id=312 bgcolor=#fefefe
| 30312 Lilyliu ||  ||  || May 3, 2000 || Socorro || LINEAR || V || align=right | 1.8 km || 
|-id=313 bgcolor=#E9E9E9
| 30313 ||  || — || May 6, 2000 || Socorro || LINEAR || VIB || align=right | 9.4 km || 
|-id=314 bgcolor=#fefefe
| 30314 Yelenam ||  ||  || May 6, 2000 || Socorro || LINEAR || FLO || align=right | 3.0 km || 
|-id=315 bgcolor=#d6d6d6
| 30315 ||  || — || May 6, 2000 || Socorro || LINEAR || THM || align=right | 6.5 km || 
|-id=316 bgcolor=#fefefe
| 30316 Scottmassa ||  ||  || May 6, 2000 || Socorro || LINEAR || — || align=right | 2.9 km || 
|-id=317 bgcolor=#E9E9E9
| 30317 ||  || — || May 3, 2000 || Socorro || LINEAR || — || align=right | 5.1 km || 
|-id=318 bgcolor=#E9E9E9
| 30318 ||  || — || May 5, 2000 || Socorro || LINEAR || — || align=right | 4.2 km || 
|-id=319 bgcolor=#d6d6d6
| 30319 ||  || — || May 5, 2000 || Socorro || LINEAR || — || align=right | 6.0 km || 
|-id=320 bgcolor=#fefefe
| 30320 ||  || — || May 6, 2000 || Socorro || LINEAR || — || align=right | 3.4 km || 
|-id=321 bgcolor=#fefefe
| 30321 McCleary ||  ||  || May 6, 2000 || Socorro || LINEAR || FLO || align=right | 2.6 km || 
|-id=322 bgcolor=#E9E9E9
| 30322 ||  || — || May 6, 2000 || Socorro || LINEAR || — || align=right | 9.3 km || 
|-id=323 bgcolor=#fefefe
| 30323 Anyam ||  ||  || May 6, 2000 || Socorro || LINEAR || V || align=right | 2.5 km || 
|-id=324 bgcolor=#fefefe
| 30324 Pandya ||  ||  || May 5, 2000 || Socorro || LINEAR || — || align=right | 1.9 km || 
|-id=325 bgcolor=#E9E9E9
| 30325 Reesabpathak ||  ||  || May 6, 2000 || Socorro || LINEAR || — || align=right | 2.8 km || 
|-id=326 bgcolor=#fefefe
| 30326 Maxpine ||  ||  || May 6, 2000 || Socorro || LINEAR || — || align=right | 4.0 km || 
|-id=327 bgcolor=#E9E9E9
| 30327 Prembabu ||  ||  || May 6, 2000 || Socorro || LINEAR || NEM || align=right | 7.2 km || 
|-id=328 bgcolor=#fefefe
| 30328 Emilyspencer ||  ||  || May 7, 2000 || Socorro || LINEAR || — || align=right | 3.0 km || 
|-id=329 bgcolor=#fefefe
| 30329 ||  || — || May 7, 2000 || Socorro || LINEAR || V || align=right | 2.9 km || 
|-id=330 bgcolor=#fefefe
| 30330 Tiffanysun ||  ||  || May 7, 2000 || Socorro || LINEAR || — || align=right | 4.6 km || 
|-id=331 bgcolor=#d6d6d6
| 30331 ||  || — || May 7, 2000 || Socorro || LINEAR || EMA || align=right | 12 km || 
|-id=332 bgcolor=#fefefe
| 30332 Tanaytandon ||  ||  || May 7, 2000 || Socorro || LINEAR || — || align=right | 2.8 km || 
|-id=333 bgcolor=#fefefe
| 30333 Stevenwang ||  ||  || May 7, 2000 || Socorro || LINEAR || — || align=right | 3.2 km || 
|-id=334 bgcolor=#fefefe
| 30334 Michaelwiner ||  ||  || May 7, 2000 || Socorro || LINEAR || — || align=right | 5.7 km || 
|-id=335 bgcolor=#d6d6d6
| 30335 ||  || — || May 7, 2000 || Socorro || LINEAR || — || align=right | 8.5 km || 
|-id=336 bgcolor=#E9E9E9
| 30336 Zhangyizhen ||  ||  || May 7, 2000 || Socorro || LINEAR || — || align=right | 3.3 km || 
|-id=337 bgcolor=#fefefe
| 30337 Crystalzheng ||  ||  || May 7, 2000 || Socorro || LINEAR || NYS || align=right | 6.4 km || 
|-id=338 bgcolor=#fefefe
| 30338 ||  || — || May 7, 2000 || Socorro || LINEAR || FLO || align=right | 2.4 km || 
|-id=339 bgcolor=#E9E9E9
| 30339 ||  || — || May 7, 2000 || Socorro || LINEAR || — || align=right | 3.9 km || 
|-id=340 bgcolor=#fefefe
| 30340 ||  || — || May 7, 2000 || Socorro || LINEAR || — || align=right | 2.8 km || 
|-id=341 bgcolor=#fefefe
| 30341 ||  || — || May 7, 2000 || Socorro || LINEAR || V || align=right | 2.0 km || 
|-id=342 bgcolor=#d6d6d6
| 30342 ||  || — || May 7, 2000 || Socorro || LINEAR || KOR || align=right | 4.8 km || 
|-id=343 bgcolor=#fefefe
| 30343 ||  || — || May 7, 2000 || Socorro || LINEAR || NYS || align=right | 2.7 km || 
|-id=344 bgcolor=#E9E9E9
| 30344 ||  || — || May 7, 2000 || Socorro || LINEAR || — || align=right | 3.5 km || 
|-id=345 bgcolor=#E9E9E9
| 30345 ||  || — || May 7, 2000 || Socorro || LINEAR || — || align=right | 7.0 km || 
|-id=346 bgcolor=#d6d6d6
| 30346 ||  || — || May 7, 2000 || Socorro || LINEAR || THB || align=right | 13 km || 
|-id=347 bgcolor=#fefefe
| 30347 Pattyhunt ||  ||  || May 7, 2000 || Socorro || LINEAR || — || align=right | 2.9 km || 
|-id=348 bgcolor=#d6d6d6
| 30348 Marizzabailey ||  ||  || May 7, 2000 || Socorro || LINEAR || — || align=right | 4.6 km || 
|-id=349 bgcolor=#E9E9E9
| 30349 ||  || — || May 7, 2000 || Socorro || LINEAR || — || align=right | 7.1 km || 
|-id=350 bgcolor=#fefefe
| 30350 Beltecas ||  ||  || May 7, 2000 || Socorro || LINEAR || FLO || align=right | 2.6 km || 
|-id=351 bgcolor=#E9E9E9
| 30351 ||  || — || May 7, 2000 || Socorro || LINEAR || EUN || align=right | 4.3 km || 
|-id=352 bgcolor=#d6d6d6
| 30352 ||  || — || May 7, 2000 || Socorro || LINEAR || KOR || align=right | 4.7 km || 
|-id=353 bgcolor=#d6d6d6
| 30353 Carothers ||  ||  || May 7, 2000 || Socorro || LINEAR || KOR || align=right | 3.0 km || 
|-id=354 bgcolor=#d6d6d6
| 30354 ||  || — || May 7, 2000 || Socorro || LINEAR || THM || align=right | 5.6 km || 
|-id=355 bgcolor=#fefefe
| 30355 ||  || — || May 7, 2000 || Socorro || LINEAR || — || align=right | 2.6 km || 
|-id=356 bgcolor=#E9E9E9
| 30356 ||  || — || May 7, 2000 || Socorro || LINEAR || — || align=right | 2.2 km || 
|-id=357 bgcolor=#E9E9E9
| 30357 Davisdon ||  ||  || May 7, 2000 || Socorro || LINEAR || — || align=right | 2.8 km || 
|-id=358 bgcolor=#fefefe
| 30358 ||  || — || May 9, 2000 || Socorro || LINEAR || V || align=right | 3.2 km || 
|-id=359 bgcolor=#E9E9E9
| 30359 ||  || — || May 9, 2000 || Socorro || LINEAR || EUN || align=right | 4.1 km || 
|-id=360 bgcolor=#fefefe
| 30360 ||  || — || May 9, 2000 || Socorro || LINEAR || — || align=right | 3.3 km || 
|-id=361 bgcolor=#E9E9E9
| 30361 ||  || — || May 9, 2000 || Socorro || LINEAR || — || align=right | 3.7 km || 
|-id=362 bgcolor=#fefefe
| 30362 Jenniferdean ||  ||  || May 6, 2000 || Socorro || LINEAR || FLO || align=right | 1.8 km || 
|-id=363 bgcolor=#fefefe
| 30363 Dellasantina ||  ||  || May 6, 2000 || Socorro || LINEAR || NYS || align=right | 2.7 km || 
|-id=364 bgcolor=#fefefe
| 30364 ||  || — || May 6, 2000 || Socorro || LINEAR || NYS || align=right | 4.6 km || 
|-id=365 bgcolor=#fefefe
| 30365 Gregduran ||  ||  || May 6, 2000 || Socorro || LINEAR || NYS || align=right | 2.5 km || 
|-id=366 bgcolor=#E9E9E9
| 30366 ||  || — || May 6, 2000 || Socorro || LINEAR || EUN || align=right | 4.7 km || 
|-id=367 bgcolor=#E9E9E9
| 30367 ||  || — || May 6, 2000 || Socorro || LINEAR || GEF || align=right | 4.5 km || 
|-id=368 bgcolor=#E9E9E9
| 30368 Ericferrante ||  ||  || May 6, 2000 || Socorro || LINEAR || — || align=right | 4.2 km || 
|-id=369 bgcolor=#E9E9E9
| 30369 ||  || — || May 6, 2000 || Socorro || LINEAR || — || align=right | 4.2 km || 
|-id=370 bgcolor=#fefefe
| 30370 Jongoetz ||  ||  || May 6, 2000 || Socorro || LINEAR || — || align=right | 3.1 km || 
|-id=371 bgcolor=#fefefe
| 30371 Johngorman ||  ||  || May 7, 2000 || Socorro || LINEAR || V || align=right | 1.7 km || 
|-id=372 bgcolor=#E9E9E9
| 30372 Halback ||  ||  || May 7, 2000 || Socorro || LINEAR || — || align=right | 2.5 km || 
|-id=373 bgcolor=#fefefe
| 30373 Mattharley ||  ||  || May 9, 2000 || Socorro || LINEAR || V || align=right | 2.1 km || 
|-id=374 bgcolor=#fefefe
| 30374 Bobbiehinson ||  ||  || May 9, 2000 || Socorro || LINEAR || V || align=right | 2.0 km || 
|-id=375 bgcolor=#E9E9E9
| 30375 Kathuang ||  ||  || May 9, 2000 || Socorro || LINEAR || — || align=right | 2.5 km || 
|-id=376 bgcolor=#E9E9E9
| 30376 ||  || — || May 5, 2000 || Socorro || LINEAR || ADE || align=right | 14 km || 
|-id=377 bgcolor=#E9E9E9
| 30377 ||  || — || May 6, 2000 || Socorro || LINEAR || EUN || align=right | 5.3 km || 
|-id=378 bgcolor=#fefefe
| 30378 ||  || — || May 6, 2000 || Kitt Peak || Spacewatch || — || align=right | 2.7 km || 
|-id=379 bgcolor=#E9E9E9
| 30379 Molaro ||  ||  || May 2, 2000 || Anderson Mesa || LONEOS || POS || align=right | 6.7 km || 
|-id=380 bgcolor=#fefefe
| 30380 ||  || — || May 6, 2000 || Socorro || LINEAR || FLO || align=right | 2.1 km || 
|-id=381 bgcolor=#E9E9E9
| 30381 ||  || — || May 6, 2000 || Socorro || LINEAR || — || align=right | 4.4 km || 
|-id=382 bgcolor=#E9E9E9
| 30382 ||  || — || May 15, 2000 || Črni Vrh || Črni Vrh || RAF || align=right | 3.3 km || 
|-id=383 bgcolor=#fefefe
| 30383 ||  || — || May 26, 2000 || Črni Vrh || Črni Vrh || — || align=right | 2.8 km || 
|-id=384 bgcolor=#E9E9E9
| 30384 Robertirelan ||  ||  || May 27, 2000 || Socorro || LINEAR || HEN || align=right | 3.0 km || 
|-id=385 bgcolor=#E9E9E9
| 30385 ||  || — || May 27, 2000 || Socorro || LINEAR || — || align=right | 4.6 km || 
|-id=386 bgcolor=#E9E9E9
| 30386 Philipjeffery ||  ||  || May 28, 2000 || Socorro || LINEAR || — || align=right | 4.6 km || 
|-id=387 bgcolor=#E9E9E9
| 30387 ||  || — || May 28, 2000 || Socorro || LINEAR || EUN || align=right | 4.7 km || 
|-id=388 bgcolor=#E9E9E9
| 30388 Nicolejustice ||  ||  || May 28, 2000 || Socorro || LINEAR || — || align=right | 6.0 km || 
|-id=389 bgcolor=#d6d6d6
| 30389 Ledoux ||  ||  || May 28, 2000 || Socorro || LINEAR || KOR || align=right | 3.5 km || 
|-id=390 bgcolor=#d6d6d6
| 30390 ||  || — || May 28, 2000 || Socorro || LINEAR || THM || align=right | 8.4 km || 
|-id=391 bgcolor=#d6d6d6
| 30391 ||  || — || May 28, 2000 || Socorro || LINEAR || — || align=right | 4.9 km || 
|-id=392 bgcolor=#E9E9E9
| 30392 ||  || — || May 28, 2000 || Socorro || LINEAR || — || align=right | 4.6 km || 
|-id=393 bgcolor=#E9E9E9
| 30393 ||  || — || May 28, 2000 || Socorro || LINEAR || — || align=right | 9.6 km || 
|-id=394 bgcolor=#d6d6d6
| 30394 ||  || — || May 28, 2000 || Socorro || LINEAR || — || align=right | 11 km || 
|-id=395 bgcolor=#E9E9E9
| 30395 ||  || — || May 28, 2000 || Socorro || LINEAR || — || align=right | 7.2 km || 
|-id=396 bgcolor=#d6d6d6
| 30396 Annleonard ||  ||  || May 28, 2000 || Socorro || LINEAR || — || align=right | 5.8 km || 
|-id=397 bgcolor=#E9E9E9
| 30397 ||  || — || May 24, 2000 || Kitt Peak || Spacewatch || — || align=right | 6.7 km || 
|-id=398 bgcolor=#d6d6d6
| 30398 ||  || — || May 30, 2000 || Ondřejov || P. Kušnirák || MEL || align=right | 11 km || 
|-id=399 bgcolor=#E9E9E9
| 30399 ||  || — || May 28, 2000 || Socorro || LINEAR || — || align=right | 6.7 km || 
|-id=400 bgcolor=#fefefe
| 30400 ||  || — || May 28, 2000 || Socorro || LINEAR || LCI || align=right | 2.9 km || 
|}

30401–30500 

|-bgcolor=#d6d6d6
| 30401 ||  || — || May 28, 2000 || Socorro || LINEAR || URS || align=right | 15 km || 
|-id=402 bgcolor=#fefefe
| 30402 ||  || — || May 23, 2000 || Anderson Mesa || LONEOS || — || align=right | 3.1 km || 
|-id=403 bgcolor=#E9E9E9
| 30403 ||  || — || May 27, 2000 || Socorro || LINEAR || — || align=right | 4.8 km || 
|-id=404 bgcolor=#E9E9E9
| 30404 ||  || — || May 31, 2000 || Kitt Peak || Spacewatch || — || align=right | 2.6 km || 
|-id=405 bgcolor=#fefefe
| 30405 ||  || — || May 23, 2000 || Anderson Mesa || LONEOS || — || align=right | 2.2 km || 
|-id=406 bgcolor=#fefefe
| 30406 Middleman ||  ||  || May 27, 2000 || Socorro || LINEAR || FLO || align=right | 3.3 km || 
|-id=407 bgcolor=#fefefe
| 30407 Pantano ||  ||  || May 27, 2000 || Socorro || LINEAR || — || align=right | 2.3 km || 
|-id=408 bgcolor=#d6d6d6
| 30408 ||  || — || May 27, 2000 || Socorro || LINEAR || TEL || align=right | 4.4 km || 
|-id=409 bgcolor=#E9E9E9
| 30409 Piccirillo ||  ||  || May 27, 2000 || Socorro || LINEAR || — || align=right | 3.0 km || 
|-id=410 bgcolor=#d6d6d6
| 30410 ||  || — || May 27, 2000 || Socorro || LINEAR || EOS || align=right | 5.8 km || 
|-id=411 bgcolor=#fefefe
| 30411 ||  || — || May 24, 2000 || Anderson Mesa || LONEOS || NYS || align=right | 6.2 km || 
|-id=412 bgcolor=#d6d6d6
| 30412 ||  || — || May 24, 2000 || Anderson Mesa || LONEOS || — || align=right | 4.5 km || 
|-id=413 bgcolor=#d6d6d6
| 30413 ||  || — || May 25, 2000 || Anderson Mesa || LONEOS || — || align=right | 9.2 km || 
|-id=414 bgcolor=#E9E9E9
| 30414 Pistacchi ||  ||  || May 29, 2000 || Socorro || LINEAR || — || align=right | 2.6 km || 
|-id=415 bgcolor=#E9E9E9
| 30415 ||  || — || May 27, 2000 || Socorro || LINEAR || — || align=right | 4.0 km || 
|-id=416 bgcolor=#fefefe
| 30416 Schacht ||  ||  || May 27, 2000 || Socorro || LINEAR || — || align=right | 2.0 km || 
|-id=417 bgcolor=#E9E9E9
| 30417 Staudt || 2000 LF ||  || June 1, 2000 || Prescott || P. G. Comba || MIS || align=right | 9.9 km || 
|-id=418 bgcolor=#E9E9E9
| 30418 Jakobsteiner || 2000 LG ||  || June 1, 2000 || Prescott || P. G. Comba || ADE || align=right | 7.4 km || 
|-id=419 bgcolor=#E9E9E9
| 30419 || 2000 LU || — || June 2, 2000 || Reedy Creek || J. Broughton || — || align=right | 6.8 km || 
|-id=420 bgcolor=#E9E9E9
| 30420 ||  || — || June 1, 2000 || Črni Vrh || Črni Vrh || — || align=right | 5.0 km || 
|-id=421 bgcolor=#E9E9E9
| 30421 Jameschafer ||  ||  || June 4, 2000 || Socorro || LINEAR || GEF || align=right | 4.1 km || 
|-id=422 bgcolor=#E9E9E9
| 30422 ||  || — || June 4, 2000 || Socorro || LINEAR || — || align=right | 5.8 km || 
|-id=423 bgcolor=#d6d6d6
| 30423 ||  || — || June 4, 2000 || Socorro || LINEAR || URS || align=right | 11 km || 
|-id=424 bgcolor=#fefefe
| 30424 ||  || — || June 5, 2000 || Socorro || LINEAR || — || align=right | 3.4 km || 
|-id=425 bgcolor=#E9E9E9
| 30425 Silverman ||  ||  || June 5, 2000 || Socorro || LINEAR || MRX || align=right | 3.3 km || 
|-id=426 bgcolor=#fefefe
| 30426 Philtalbot ||  ||  || June 5, 2000 || Socorro || LINEAR || — || align=right | 3.2 km || 
|-id=427 bgcolor=#d6d6d6
| 30427 ||  || — || June 5, 2000 || Socorro || LINEAR || — || align=right | 8.2 km || 
|-id=428 bgcolor=#E9E9E9
| 30428 ||  || — || June 4, 2000 || Socorro || LINEAR || — || align=right | 7.9 km || 
|-id=429 bgcolor=#d6d6d6
| 30429 ||  || — || June 4, 2000 || Socorro || LINEAR || — || align=right | 6.9 km || 
|-id=430 bgcolor=#fefefe
| 30430 Robertoegel ||  ||  || June 4, 2000 || Socorro || LINEAR || FLO || align=right | 2.6 km || 
|-id=431 bgcolor=#fefefe
| 30431 Michaeltran ||  ||  || June 4, 2000 || Socorro || LINEAR || — || align=right | 2.5 km || 
|-id=432 bgcolor=#E9E9E9
| 30432 ||  || — || June 8, 2000 || Socorro || LINEAR || EUN || align=right | 6.4 km || 
|-id=433 bgcolor=#d6d6d6
| 30433 ||  || — || June 8, 2000 || Socorro || LINEAR || URS || align=right | 14 km || 
|-id=434 bgcolor=#d6d6d6
| 30434 ||  || — || June 8, 2000 || Socorro || LINEAR || — || align=right | 11 km || 
|-id=435 bgcolor=#d6d6d6
| 30435 ||  || — || June 9, 2000 || Anderson Mesa || LONEOS || 3:2 || align=right | 10 km || 
|-id=436 bgcolor=#E9E9E9
| 30436 ||  || — || June 9, 2000 || Anderson Mesa || LONEOS || — || align=right | 6.8 km || 
|-id=437 bgcolor=#fefefe
| 30437 Michtchenko ||  ||  || June 5, 2000 || Anderson Mesa || LONEOS || V || align=right | 3.5 km || 
|-id=438 bgcolor=#E9E9E9
| 30438 ||  || — || June 3, 2000 || Anderson Mesa || LONEOS || — || align=right | 5.3 km || 
|-id=439 bgcolor=#fefefe
| 30439 Moe || 2000 MB ||  || June 21, 2000 || Reedy Creek || J. Broughton || — || align=right | 5.1 km || 
|-id=440 bgcolor=#d6d6d6
| 30440 Larry || 2000 MG ||  || June 22, 2000 || Reedy Creek || J. Broughton || — || align=right | 5.7 km || 
|-id=441 bgcolor=#d6d6d6
| 30441 Curly || 2000 MX ||  || June 24, 2000 || Reedy Creek || J. Broughton || HYG || align=right | 9.1 km || 
|-id=442 bgcolor=#d6d6d6
| 30442 ||  || — || June 25, 2000 || Socorro || LINEAR || EOS || align=right | 7.7 km || 
|-id=443 bgcolor=#E9E9E9
| 30443 Stieltjes || 2000 NR ||  || July 3, 2000 || Prescott || P. G. Comba || — || align=right | 8.2 km || 
|-id=444 bgcolor=#E9E9E9
| 30444 Shemp ||  ||  || July 5, 2000 || Reedy Creek || J. Broughton || GEF || align=right | 4.1 km || 
|-id=445 bgcolor=#E9E9E9
| 30445 Stirling ||  ||  || July 5, 2000 || Prescott || P. G. Comba || EUN || align=right | 4.3 km || 
|-id=446 bgcolor=#E9E9E9
| 30446 ||  || — || July 3, 2000 || Socorro || LINEAR || — || align=right | 6.6 km || 
|-id=447 bgcolor=#d6d6d6
| 30447 ||  || — || July 3, 2000 || Socorro || LINEAR || — || align=right | 5.0 km || 
|-id=448 bgcolor=#E9E9E9
| 30448 Yoshiomoriyama ||  ||  || July 7, 2000 || Bisei SG Center || BATTeRS || — || align=right | 6.6 km || 
|-id=449 bgcolor=#d6d6d6
| 30449 ||  || — || July 5, 2000 || Anderson Mesa || LONEOS || ITH || align=right | 5.7 km || 
|-id=450 bgcolor=#d6d6d6
| 30450 ||  || — || July 6, 2000 || Kitt Peak || Spacewatch || EOS || align=right | 5.7 km || 
|-id=451 bgcolor=#d6d6d6
| 30451 ||  || — || July 5, 2000 || Kitt Peak || Spacewatch || — || align=right | 7.9 km || 
|-id=452 bgcolor=#d6d6d6
| 30452 ||  || — || July 4, 2000 || Anderson Mesa || LONEOS || — || align=right | 5.2 km || 
|-id=453 bgcolor=#d6d6d6
| 30453 ||  || — || July 4, 2000 || Anderson Mesa || LONEOS || — || align=right | 11 km || 
|-id=454 bgcolor=#d6d6d6
| 30454 ||  || — || July 4, 2000 || Anderson Mesa || LONEOS || EOS || align=right | 8.2 km || 
|-id=455 bgcolor=#d6d6d6
| 30455 ||  || — || July 4, 2000 || Anderson Mesa || LONEOS || — || align=right | 7.2 km || 
|-id=456 bgcolor=#d6d6d6
| 30456 ||  || — || July 23, 2000 || Socorro || LINEAR || — || align=right | 8.2 km || 
|-id=457 bgcolor=#d6d6d6
| 30457 ||  || — || July 24, 2000 || Socorro || LINEAR || EOS || align=right | 6.3 km || 
|-id=458 bgcolor=#d6d6d6
| 30458 ||  || — || July 24, 2000 || Socorro || LINEAR || — || align=right | 7.6 km || 
|-id=459 bgcolor=#fefefe
| 30459 ||  || — || July 29, 2000 || Socorro || LINEAR || FLO || align=right | 4.1 km || 
|-id=460 bgcolor=#d6d6d6
| 30460 ||  || — || July 29, 2000 || Socorro || LINEAR || — || align=right | 12 km || 
|-id=461 bgcolor=#E9E9E9
| 30461 ||  || — || July 23, 2000 || Socorro || LINEAR || MRX || align=right | 4.7 km || 
|-id=462 bgcolor=#d6d6d6
| 30462 ||  || — || July 23, 2000 || Socorro || LINEAR || EOS || align=right | 6.8 km || 
|-id=463 bgcolor=#d6d6d6
| 30463 ||  || — || July 23, 2000 || Socorro || LINEAR || EOS || align=right | 6.0 km || 
|-id=464 bgcolor=#E9E9E9
| 30464 ||  || — || July 23, 2000 || Socorro || LINEAR || — || align=right | 5.5 km || 
|-id=465 bgcolor=#d6d6d6
| 30465 ||  || — || July 23, 2000 || Socorro || LINEAR || — || align=right | 12 km || 
|-id=466 bgcolor=#d6d6d6
| 30466 ||  || — || July 23, 2000 || Socorro || LINEAR || — || align=right | 12 km || 
|-id=467 bgcolor=#d6d6d6
| 30467 ||  || — || July 23, 2000 || Socorro || LINEAR || — || align=right | 8.1 km || 
|-id=468 bgcolor=#d6d6d6
| 30468 ||  || — || July 23, 2000 || Socorro || LINEAR || — || align=right | 12 km || 
|-id=469 bgcolor=#d6d6d6
| 30469 ||  || — || July 23, 2000 || Socorro || LINEAR || THM || align=right | 7.9 km || 
|-id=470 bgcolor=#d6d6d6
| 30470 ||  || — || July 30, 2000 || Socorro || LINEAR || — || align=right | 8.8 km || 
|-id=471 bgcolor=#d6d6d6
| 30471 ||  || — || July 30, 2000 || Socorro || LINEAR || — || align=right | 9.8 km || 
|-id=472 bgcolor=#d6d6d6
| 30472 ||  || — || July 23, 2000 || Socorro || LINEAR || — || align=right | 19 km || 
|-id=473 bgcolor=#d6d6d6
| 30473 Ethanbutson ||  ||  || July 23, 2000 || Socorro || LINEAR || — || align=right | 9.7 km || 
|-id=474 bgcolor=#E9E9E9
| 30474 ||  || — || July 23, 2000 || Socorro || LINEAR || GEF || align=right | 3.9 km || 
|-id=475 bgcolor=#d6d6d6
| 30475 ||  || — || July 30, 2000 || Socorro || LINEAR || — || align=right | 12 km || 
|-id=476 bgcolor=#E9E9E9
| 30476 ||  || — || July 30, 2000 || Socorro || LINEAR || — || align=right | 6.4 km || 
|-id=477 bgcolor=#E9E9E9
| 30477 ||  || — || July 30, 2000 || Socorro || LINEAR || — || align=right | 4.2 km || 
|-id=478 bgcolor=#d6d6d6
| 30478 ||  || — || July 30, 2000 || Socorro || LINEAR || — || align=right | 10 km || 
|-id=479 bgcolor=#d6d6d6
| 30479 ||  || — || July 30, 2000 || Socorro || LINEAR || 7:4 || align=right | 10 km || 
|-id=480 bgcolor=#E9E9E9
| 30480 ||  || — || July 30, 2000 || Socorro || LINEAR || CLO || align=right | 3.6 km || 
|-id=481 bgcolor=#d6d6d6
| 30481 ||  || — || July 30, 2000 || Socorro || LINEAR || — || align=right | 5.3 km || 
|-id=482 bgcolor=#d6d6d6
| 30482 ||  || — || July 30, 2000 || Socorro || LINEAR || URS || align=right | 24 km || 
|-id=483 bgcolor=#d6d6d6
| 30483 ||  || — || July 24, 2000 || Anderson Mesa || LONEOS || — || align=right | 12 km || 
|-id=484 bgcolor=#d6d6d6
| 30484 ||  || — || August 5, 2000 || Haleakala || NEAT || EOS || align=right | 4.8 km || 
|-id=485 bgcolor=#d6d6d6
| 30485 ||  || — || August 1, 2000 || Socorro || LINEAR || — || align=right | 5.7 km || 
|-id=486 bgcolor=#E9E9E9
| 30486 ||  || — || August 2, 2000 || Socorro || LINEAR || — || align=right | 8.1 km || 
|-id=487 bgcolor=#d6d6d6
| 30487 Dominikovacs ||  ||  || August 24, 2000 || Socorro || LINEAR || THM || align=right | 9.6 km || 
|-id=488 bgcolor=#d6d6d6
| 30488 Steinlechner ||  ||  || August 24, 2000 || Socorro || LINEAR || KOR || align=right | 4.4 km || 
|-id=489 bgcolor=#d6d6d6
| 30489 ||  || — || August 26, 2000 || Socorro || LINEAR || — || align=right | 13 km || 
|-id=490 bgcolor=#d6d6d6
| 30490 ||  || — || August 26, 2000 || Socorro || LINEAR || URS || align=right | 14 km || 
|-id=491 bgcolor=#d6d6d6
| 30491 ||  || — || August 24, 2000 || Socorro || LINEAR || THM || align=right | 8.7 km || 
|-id=492 bgcolor=#d6d6d6
| 30492 ||  || — || August 24, 2000 || Socorro || LINEAR || THM || align=right | 10 km || 
|-id=493 bgcolor=#d6d6d6
| 30493 ||  || — || August 24, 2000 || Socorro || LINEAR || — || align=right | 11 km || 
|-id=494 bgcolor=#d6d6d6
| 30494 ||  || — || August 28, 2000 || Socorro || LINEAR || — || align=right | 11 km || 
|-id=495 bgcolor=#d6d6d6
| 30495 ||  || — || August 24, 2000 || Socorro || LINEAR || — || align=right | 11 km || 
|-id=496 bgcolor=#d6d6d6
| 30496 ||  || — || August 24, 2000 || Socorro || LINEAR || EOS || align=right | 5.8 km || 
|-id=497 bgcolor=#d6d6d6
| 30497 ||  || — || August 28, 2000 || Socorro || LINEAR || — || align=right | 17 km || 
|-id=498 bgcolor=#C2FFFF
| 30498 ||  || — || August 28, 2000 || Socorro || LINEAR || L5 || align=right | 22 km || 
|-id=499 bgcolor=#C2FFFF
| 30499 ||  || — || August 31, 2000 || Socorro || LINEAR || L5 || align=right | 21 km || 
|-id=500 bgcolor=#d6d6d6
| 30500 ||  || — || August 29, 2000 || Socorro || LINEAR || THM || align=right | 8.0 km || 
|}

30501–30600 

|-bgcolor=#d6d6d6
| 30501 ||  || — || September 1, 2000 || Socorro || LINEAR || — || align=right | 13 km || 
|-id=502 bgcolor=#d6d6d6
| 30502 ||  || — || September 1, 2000 || Socorro || LINEAR || — || align=right | 8.1 km || 
|-id=503 bgcolor=#d6d6d6
| 30503 ||  || — || September 1, 2000 || Socorro || LINEAR || EOS || align=right | 8.5 km || 
|-id=504 bgcolor=#C2FFFF
| 30504 ||  || — || September 1, 2000 || Socorro || LINEAR || L5 || align=right | 29 km || 
|-id=505 bgcolor=#C2FFFF
| 30505 ||  || — || September 1, 2000 || Socorro || LINEAR || L5 || align=right | 26 km || 
|-id=506 bgcolor=#C2FFFF
| 30506 ||  || — || September 2, 2000 || Anderson Mesa || LONEOS || L5 || align=right | 34 km || 
|-id=507 bgcolor=#d6d6d6
| 30507 ||  || — || September 19, 2000 || Haleakala || NEAT || EOS || align=right | 9.9 km || 
|-id=508 bgcolor=#C2FFFF
| 30508 ||  || — || September 22, 2000 || Socorro || LINEAR || L5 || align=right | 16 km || 
|-id=509 bgcolor=#fefefe
| 30509 Yukitrippel ||  ||  || December 28, 2000 || Socorro || LINEAR || — || align=right | 3.7 km || 
|-id=510 bgcolor=#C2FFFF
| 30510 ||  || — || February 19, 2001 || Socorro || LINEAR || L4 || align=right | 19 km || 
|-id=511 bgcolor=#E9E9E9
| 30511 ||  || — || March 18, 2001 || Haleakala || NEAT || EUN || align=right | 3.5 km || 
|-id=512 bgcolor=#d6d6d6
| 30512 ||  || — || April 21, 2001 || Socorro || LINEAR || Tj (2.82) || align=right | 18 km || 
|-id=513 bgcolor=#E9E9E9
| 30513 ||  || — || April 21, 2001 || Socorro || LINEAR || — || align=right | 4.0 km || 
|-id=514 bgcolor=#fefefe
| 30514 Chiomento ||  ||  || April 21, 2001 || Socorro || LINEAR || — || align=right | 5.1 km || 
|-id=515 bgcolor=#E9E9E9
| 30515 ||  || — || May 21, 2001 || Socorro || LINEAR || MAR || align=right | 3.4 km || 
|-id=516 bgcolor=#E9E9E9
| 30516 ||  || — || June 15, 2001 || Socorro || LINEAR || GEF || align=right | 4.1 km || 
|-id=517 bgcolor=#d6d6d6
| 30517 ||  || — || June 11, 2001 || Kitt Peak || Spacewatch || SYL7:4 || align=right | 15 km || 
|-id=518 bgcolor=#fefefe
| 30518 ||  || — || June 13, 2001 || Kitt Peak || Spacewatch || V || align=right | 2.3 km || 
|-id=519 bgcolor=#fefefe
| 30519 ||  || — || June 21, 2001 || Palomar || NEAT || — || align=right | 2.3 km || 
|-id=520 bgcolor=#fefefe
| 30520 ||  || — || June 19, 2001 || Palomar || NEAT || V || align=right | 2.1 km || 
|-id=521 bgcolor=#E9E9E9
| 30521 ||  || — || June 28, 2001 || Anderson Mesa || LONEOS || — || align=right | 4.2 km || 
|-id=522 bgcolor=#E9E9E9
| 30522 ||  || — || June 25, 2001 || Palomar || NEAT || — || align=right | 6.4 km || 
|-id=523 bgcolor=#d6d6d6
| 30523 ||  || — || June 27, 2001 || Palomar || NEAT || — || align=right | 10 km || 
|-id=524 bgcolor=#fefefe
| 30524 Mandushev ||  ||  || June 16, 2001 || Anderson Mesa || LONEOS || — || align=right | 2.3 km || 
|-id=525 bgcolor=#E9E9E9
| 30525 Lenbright ||  ||  || June 27, 2001 || Anderson Mesa || LONEOS || HEN || align=right | 2.9 km || 
|-id=526 bgcolor=#fefefe
| 30526 ||  || — || July 13, 2001 || Reedy Creek || J. Broughton || — || align=right | 2.6 km || 
|-id=527 bgcolor=#d6d6d6
| 30527 ||  || — || July 14, 2001 || Haleakala || NEAT || EOS || align=right | 5.8 km || 
|-id=528 bgcolor=#fefefe
| 30528 ||  || — || July 14, 2001 || Haleakala || NEAT || — || align=right | 1.7 km || 
|-id=529 bgcolor=#d6d6d6
| 30529 ||  || — || July 10, 2001 || Socorro || LINEAR || — || align=right | 15 km || 
|-id=530 bgcolor=#fefefe
| 30530 ||  || — || July 12, 2001 || Haleakala || NEAT || NYS || align=right | 1.4 km || 
|-id=531 bgcolor=#d6d6d6
| 30531 ||  || — || July 14, 2001 || Palomar || NEAT || — || align=right | 9.1 km || 
|-id=532 bgcolor=#d6d6d6
| 30532 || 2001 OO || — || July 17, 2001 || Haleakala || NEAT || EOS || align=right | 3.8 km || 
|-id=533 bgcolor=#fefefe
| 30533 Saeidzoonemat ||  ||  || July 16, 2001 || Anderson Mesa || LONEOS || NYS || align=right | 2.2 km || 
|-id=534 bgcolor=#d6d6d6
| 30534 ||  || — || July 17, 2001 || Anderson Mesa || LONEOS || — || align=right | 16 km || 
|-id=535 bgcolor=#fefefe
| 30535 Sarahgreenstreet ||  ||  || July 17, 2001 || Anderson Mesa || LONEOS || H || align=right | 2.3 km || 
|-id=536 bgcolor=#E9E9E9
| 30536 Erondón ||  ||  || July 17, 2001 || Anderson Mesa || LONEOS || GEF || align=right | 5.0 km || 
|-id=537 bgcolor=#fefefe
| 30537 ||  || — || July 17, 2001 || Anderson Mesa || LONEOS || — || align=right | 5.7 km || 
|-id=538 bgcolor=#d6d6d6
| 30538 ||  || — || July 20, 2001 || Palomar || NEAT || — || align=right | 7.5 km || 
|-id=539 bgcolor=#fefefe
| 30539 Raissamuller ||  ||  || July 20, 2001 || Socorro || LINEAR || — || align=right | 2.2 km || 
|-id=540 bgcolor=#d6d6d6
| 30540 ||  || — || July 20, 2001 || Socorro || LINEAR || — || align=right | 8.5 km || 
|-id=541 bgcolor=#d6d6d6
| 30541 ||  || — || July 21, 2001 || Anderson Mesa || LONEOS || — || align=right | 11 km || 
|-id=542 bgcolor=#E9E9E9
| 30542 ||  || — || July 21, 2001 || Palomar || NEAT || HNS || align=right | 4.6 km || 
|-id=543 bgcolor=#d6d6d6
| 30543 ||  || — || July 18, 2001 || Palomar || NEAT || — || align=right | 6.6 km || 
|-id=544 bgcolor=#fefefe
| 30544 ||  || — || July 19, 2001 || Palomar || NEAT || V || align=right | 1.9 km || 
|-id=545 bgcolor=#d6d6d6
| 30545 ||  || — || July 21, 2001 || Palomar || NEAT || — || align=right | 22 km || 
|-id=546 bgcolor=#fefefe
| 30546 ||  || — || July 20, 2001 || Palomar || NEAT || V || align=right | 2.1 km || 
|-id=547 bgcolor=#E9E9E9
| 30547 ||  || — || July 23, 2001 || Haleakala || NEAT || — || align=right | 3.3 km || 
|-id=548 bgcolor=#d6d6d6
| 30548 ||  || — || July 16, 2001 || Anderson Mesa || LONEOS || CHA || align=right | 4.2 km || 
|-id=549 bgcolor=#E9E9E9
| 30549 ||  || — || July 16, 2001 || Anderson Mesa || LONEOS || — || align=right | 2.9 km || 
|-id=550 bgcolor=#d6d6d6
| 30550 ||  || — || July 16, 2001 || Anderson Mesa || LONEOS || — || align=right | 7.0 km || 
|-id=551 bgcolor=#fefefe
| 30551 ||  || — || July 19, 2001 || Haleakala || NEAT || FLO || align=right | 1.5 km || 
|-id=552 bgcolor=#E9E9E9
| 30552 ||  || — || July 22, 2001 || Palomar || NEAT || — || align=right | 7.0 km || 
|-id=553 bgcolor=#E9E9E9
| 30553 ||  || — || July 16, 2001 || Anderson Mesa || LONEOS || — || align=right | 3.3 km || 
|-id=554 bgcolor=#fefefe
| 30554 ||  || — || July 19, 2001 || Palomar || NEAT || V || align=right | 1.9 km || 
|-id=555 bgcolor=#fefefe
| 30555 ||  || — || July 21, 2001 || Haleakala || NEAT || PHO || align=right | 3.8 km || 
|-id=556 bgcolor=#E9E9E9
| 30556 ||  || — || July 21, 2001 || Haleakala || NEAT || — || align=right | 3.1 km || 
|-id=557 bgcolor=#E9E9E9
| 30557 ||  || — || July 26, 2001 || Palomar || NEAT || — || align=right | 2.6 km || 
|-id=558 bgcolor=#fefefe
| 30558 Jamesoconnor ||  ||  || July 16, 2001 || Anderson Mesa || LONEOS || FLO || align=right | 2.2 km || 
|-id=559 bgcolor=#E9E9E9
| 30559 ||  || — || July 16, 2001 || Anderson Mesa || LONEOS || RAF || align=right | 3.1 km || 
|-id=560 bgcolor=#fefefe
| 30560 ||  || — || July 20, 2001 || Palomar || NEAT || — || align=right | 2.0 km || 
|-id=561 bgcolor=#E9E9E9
| 30561 ||  || — || July 20, 2001 || Palomar || NEAT || MRX || align=right | 5.1 km || 
|-id=562 bgcolor=#d6d6d6
| 30562 Güttler ||  ||  || July 21, 2001 || Anderson Mesa || LONEOS || THM || align=right | 7.5 km || 
|-id=563 bgcolor=#d6d6d6
| 30563 ||  || — || July 27, 2001 || Haleakala || NEAT || — || align=right | 3.1 km || 
|-id=564 bgcolor=#E9E9E9
| 30564 Olomouc ||  ||  || July 28, 2001 || Ondřejov || P. Pravec || — || align=right | 2.7 km || 
|-id=565 bgcolor=#E9E9E9
| 30565 ||  || — || July 29, 2001 || Socorro || LINEAR || — || align=right | 4.0 km || 
|-id=566 bgcolor=#fefefe
| 30566 Stokes ||  ||  || July 29, 2001 || Prescott || P. G. Comba || NYS || align=right | 2.2 km || 
|-id=567 bgcolor=#fefefe
| 30567 ||  || — || July 25, 2001 || Haleakala || NEAT || — || align=right | 1.7 km || 
|-id=568 bgcolor=#E9E9E9
| 30568 ||  || — || July 31, 2001 || Palomar || NEAT || EUN || align=right | 4.3 km || 
|-id=569 bgcolor=#E9E9E9
| 30569 ||  || — || July 27, 2001 || Anderson Mesa || LONEOS || — || align=right | 6.4 km || 
|-id=570 bgcolor=#fefefe
| 30570 ||  || — || July 24, 2001 || Palomar || NEAT || V || align=right | 3.0 km || 
|-id=571 bgcolor=#fefefe
| 30571 ||  || — || July 25, 2001 || Haleakala || NEAT || — || align=right | 3.1 km || 
|-id=572 bgcolor=#d6d6d6
| 30572 ||  || — || July 25, 2001 || Palomar || NEAT || — || align=right | 7.5 km || 
|-id=573 bgcolor=#fefefe
| 30573 ||  || — || July 27, 2001 || Anderson Mesa || LONEOS || — || align=right | 1.9 km || 
|-id=574 bgcolor=#fefefe
| 30574 ||  || — || July 27, 2001 || Anderson Mesa || LONEOS || NYS || align=right | 1.4 km || 
|-id=575 bgcolor=#d6d6d6
| 30575 ||  || — || July 28, 2001 || Anderson Mesa || LONEOS || ALA || align=right | 10 km || 
|-id=576 bgcolor=#d6d6d6
| 30576 ||  || — || July 29, 2001 || Anderson Mesa || LONEOS || — || align=right | 6.2 km || 
|-id=577 bgcolor=#fefefe
| 30577 ||  || — || July 29, 2001 || Anderson Mesa || LONEOS || H || align=right | 1.7 km || 
|-id=578 bgcolor=#E9E9E9
| 30578 ||  || — || July 28, 2001 || Anderson Mesa || LONEOS || — || align=right | 3.8 km || 
|-id=579 bgcolor=#E9E9E9
| 30579 ||  || — || July 30, 2001 || Socorro || LINEAR || — || align=right | 6.2 km || 
|-id=580 bgcolor=#d6d6d6
| 30580 ||  || — || August 3, 2001 || Haleakala || NEAT || — || align=right | 5.5 km || 
|-id=581 bgcolor=#E9E9E9
| 30581 ||  || — || August 3, 2001 || Haleakala || NEAT || — || align=right | 7.4 km || 
|-id=582 bgcolor=#E9E9E9
| 30582 ||  || — || August 5, 2001 || Palomar || NEAT || — || align=right | 2.7 km || 
|-id=583 bgcolor=#E9E9E9
| 30583 ||  || — || August 10, 2001 || Haleakala || NEAT || MAR || align=right | 2.9 km || 
|-id=584 bgcolor=#E9E9E9
| 30584 ||  || — || August 11, 2001 || Haleakala || NEAT || EUN || align=right | 5.7 km || 
|-id=585 bgcolor=#E9E9E9
| 30585 Firenze ||  ||  || August 14, 2001 || San Marcello || A. Boattini, M. Tombelli || — || align=right | 2.5 km || 
|-id=586 bgcolor=#fefefe
| 30586 ||  || — || August 10, 2001 || Haleakala || NEAT || — || align=right | 1.4 km || 
|-id=587 bgcolor=#E9E9E9
| 30587 ||  || — || August 10, 2001 || Palomar || NEAT || EUN || align=right | 4.9 km || 
|-id=588 bgcolor=#d6d6d6
| 30588 ||  || — || August 10, 2001 || Palomar || NEAT || — || align=right | 17 km || 
|-id=589 bgcolor=#d6d6d6
| 30589 ||  || — || August 16, 2001 || Socorro || LINEAR || EOS || align=right | 7.2 km || 
|-id=590 bgcolor=#fefefe
| 30590 ||  || — || August 16, 2001 || Socorro || LINEAR || — || align=right | 1.8 km || 
|-id=591 bgcolor=#E9E9E9
| 30591 ||  || — || August 16, 2001 || Socorro || LINEAR || MISslow || align=right | 8.0 km || 
|-id=592 bgcolor=#d6d6d6
| 30592 ||  || — || August 16, 2001 || Socorro || LINEAR || — || align=right | 6.2 km || 
|-id=593 bgcolor=#E9E9E9
| 30593 Dangovski ||  ||  || August 16, 2001 || Socorro || LINEAR || — || align=right | 6.0 km || 
|-id=594 bgcolor=#d6d6d6
| 30594 ||  || — || August 16, 2001 || Socorro || LINEAR || — || align=right | 16 km || 
|-id=595 bgcolor=#d6d6d6
| 30595 ||  || — || August 16, 2001 || Socorro || LINEAR || — || align=right | 6.1 km || 
|-id=596 bgcolor=#fefefe
| 30596 Amdeans ||  ||  || August 17, 2001 || Socorro || LINEAR || FLO || align=right | 5.1 km || 
|-id=597 bgcolor=#E9E9E9
| 30597 ||  || — || August 17, 2001 || Socorro || LINEAR || — || align=right | 5.0 km || 
|-id=598 bgcolor=#E9E9E9
| 30598 ||  || — || August 17, 2001 || Socorro || LINEAR || EUN || align=right | 6.3 km || 
|-id=599 bgcolor=#fefefe
| 30599 || 2052 P-L || — || September 24, 1960 || Palomar || PLS || — || align=right | 1.7 km || 
|-id=600 bgcolor=#E9E9E9
| 30600 || 2078 P-L || — || September 26, 1960 || Palomar || PLS || — || align=right | 5.6 km || 
|}

30601–30700 

|-bgcolor=#fefefe
| 30601 || 2082 P-L || — || September 24, 1960 || Palomar || PLS || FLO || align=right | 2.1 km || 
|-id=602 bgcolor=#E9E9E9
| 30602 || 2086 P-L || — || September 24, 1960 || Palomar || PLS || — || align=right | 2.8 km || 
|-id=603 bgcolor=#E9E9E9
| 30603 || 2106 P-L || — || September 24, 1960 || Palomar || PLS || — || align=right | 1.9 km || 
|-id=604 bgcolor=#fefefe
| 30604 || 2107 P-L || — || September 24, 1960 || Palomar || PLS || FLO || align=right | 2.4 km || 
|-id=605 bgcolor=#fefefe
| 30605 || 2204 P-L || — || September 24, 1960 || Palomar || PLS || FLO || align=right | 2.5 km || 
|-id=606 bgcolor=#E9E9E9
| 30606 || 2503 P-L || — || September 26, 1960 || Palomar || PLS || MAR || align=right | 5.0 km || 
|-id=607 bgcolor=#fefefe
| 30607 || 2507 P-L || — || September 24, 1960 || Palomar || PLS || FLO || align=right | 2.5 km || 
|-id=608 bgcolor=#E9E9E9
| 30608 || 2573 P-L || — || September 24, 1960 || Palomar || PLS || — || align=right | 2.8 km || 
|-id=609 bgcolor=#E9E9E9
| 30609 || 2618 P-L || — || September 24, 1960 || Palomar || PLS || — || align=right | 3.6 km || 
|-id=610 bgcolor=#E9E9E9
| 30610 || 2623 P-L || — || September 24, 1960 || Palomar || PLS || MAR || align=right | 1.9 km || 
|-id=611 bgcolor=#E9E9E9
| 30611 || 2627 P-L || — || September 24, 1960 || Palomar || PLS || — || align=right | 3.6 km || 
|-id=612 bgcolor=#E9E9E9
| 30612 || 2638 P-L || — || September 24, 1960 || Palomar || PLS || — || align=right | 2.0 km || 
|-id=613 bgcolor=#fefefe
| 30613 || 2678 P-L || — || September 24, 1960 || Palomar || PLS || MAS || align=right | 2.9 km || 
|-id=614 bgcolor=#fefefe
| 30614 || 2778 P-L || — || September 24, 1960 || Palomar || PLS || — || align=right | 4.5 km || 
|-id=615 bgcolor=#fefefe
| 30615 || 2818 P-L || — || September 24, 1960 || Palomar || PLS || — || align=right | 2.9 km || 
|-id=616 bgcolor=#fefefe
| 30616 || 3049 P-L || — || September 24, 1960 || Palomar || PLS || — || align=right | 3.4 km || 
|-id=617 bgcolor=#E9E9E9
| 30617 || 3068 P-L || — || September 25, 1960 || Palomar || PLS || — || align=right | 3.5 km || 
|-id=618 bgcolor=#fefefe
| 30618 || 3084 P-L || — || September 25, 1960 || Palomar || PLS || — || align=right | 2.7 km || 
|-id=619 bgcolor=#E9E9E9
| 30619 || 4045 P-L || — || September 24, 1960 || Palomar || PLS || — || align=right | 2.9 km || 
|-id=620 bgcolor=#E9E9E9
| 30620 || 4126 P-L || — || September 24, 1960 || Palomar || PLS || — || align=right | 2.1 km || 
|-id=621 bgcolor=#E9E9E9
| 30621 || 4189 P-L || — || September 24, 1960 || Palomar || PLS || — || align=right | 2.6 km || 
|-id=622 bgcolor=#d6d6d6
| 30622 || 4213 P-L || — || September 24, 1960 || Palomar || PLS || TEL || align=right | 3.4 km || 
|-id=623 bgcolor=#fefefe
| 30623 || 4226 P-L || — || September 25, 1960 || Palomar || PLS || NYS || align=right | 2.1 km || 
|-id=624 bgcolor=#fefefe
| 30624 || 4232 P-L || — || September 24, 1960 || Palomar || PLS || NYS || align=right | 1.5 km || 
|-id=625 bgcolor=#fefefe
| 30625 || 4236 P-L || — || September 24, 1960 || Palomar || PLS || V || align=right | 2.3 km || 
|-id=626 bgcolor=#d6d6d6
| 30626 || 4240 P-L || — || September 24, 1960 || Palomar || PLS || EOS || align=right | 4.2 km || 
|-id=627 bgcolor=#d6d6d6
| 30627 || 4269 P-L || — || September 24, 1960 || Palomar || PLS || TEL || align=right | 10 km || 
|-id=628 bgcolor=#E9E9E9
| 30628 || 4644 P-L || — || September 24, 1960 || Palomar || PLS || PAD || align=right | 4.6 km || 
|-id=629 bgcolor=#E9E9E9
| 30629 || 4667 P-L || — || September 26, 1960 || Palomar || PLS || — || align=right | 8.2 km || 
|-id=630 bgcolor=#fefefe
| 30630 || 4733 P-L || — || September 24, 1960 || Palomar || PLS || V || align=right | 1.4 km || 
|-id=631 bgcolor=#E9E9E9
| 30631 || 6026 P-L || — || September 24, 1960 || Palomar || PLS || GEF || align=right | 2.2 km || 
|-id=632 bgcolor=#fefefe
| 30632 || 6117 P-L || — || September 26, 1960 || Palomar || PLS || — || align=right | 4.7 km || 
|-id=633 bgcolor=#E9E9E9
| 30633 || 6120 P-L || — || September 24, 1960 || Palomar || PLS || — || align=right | 2.5 km || 
|-id=634 bgcolor=#E9E9E9
| 30634 || 6128 P-L || — || September 24, 1960 || Palomar || PLS || — || align=right | 2.1 km || 
|-id=635 bgcolor=#fefefe
| 30635 || 6186 P-L || — || September 24, 1960 || Palomar || PLS || FLO || align=right | 1.6 km || 
|-id=636 bgcolor=#fefefe
| 30636 || 6190 P-L || — || September 24, 1960 || Palomar || PLS || FLO || align=right | 2.0 km || 
|-id=637 bgcolor=#d6d6d6
| 30637 || 6196 P-L || — || September 24, 1960 || Palomar || PLS || EOS || align=right | 4.5 km || 
|-id=638 bgcolor=#E9E9E9
| 30638 || 6237 P-L || — || September 24, 1960 || Palomar || PLS || PAD || align=right | 4.9 km || 
|-id=639 bgcolor=#d6d6d6
| 30639 || 6246 P-L || — || September 24, 1960 || Palomar || PLS || HYG || align=right | 8.7 km || 
|-id=640 bgcolor=#fefefe
| 30640 || 6319 P-L || — || September 24, 1960 || Palomar || PLS || — || align=right | 2.1 km || 
|-id=641 bgcolor=#E9E9E9
| 30641 || 6349 P-L || — || September 24, 1960 || Palomar || PLS || — || align=right | 4.0 km || 
|-id=642 bgcolor=#E9E9E9
| 30642 || 6532 P-L || — || September 24, 1960 || Palomar || PLS || — || align=right | 1.9 km || 
|-id=643 bgcolor=#d6d6d6
| 30643 || 6590 P-L || — || September 24, 1960 || Palomar || PLS || EOS || align=right | 5.7 km || 
|-id=644 bgcolor=#fefefe
| 30644 || 6601 P-L || — || September 24, 1960 || Palomar || PLS || V || align=right | 1.6 km || 
|-id=645 bgcolor=#E9E9E9
| 30645 || 6604 P-L || — || September 24, 1960 || Palomar || PLS || — || align=right | 2.4 km || 
|-id=646 bgcolor=#fefefe
| 30646 || 6623 P-L || — || September 24, 1960 || Palomar || PLS || — || align=right | 4.2 km || 
|-id=647 bgcolor=#fefefe
| 30647 || 6642 P-L || — || September 24, 1960 || Palomar || PLS || — || align=right | 2.1 km || 
|-id=648 bgcolor=#fefefe
| 30648 || 6679 P-L || — || September 24, 1960 || Palomar || PLS || — || align=right | 2.4 km || 
|-id=649 bgcolor=#fefefe
| 30649 || 6871 P-L || — || September 24, 1960 || Palomar || PLS || — || align=right | 1.7 km || 
|-id=650 bgcolor=#E9E9E9
| 30650 || 7638 P-L || — || October 17, 1960 || Palomar || PLS || — || align=right | 4.0 km || 
|-id=651 bgcolor=#fefefe
| 30651 || 9588 P-L || — || October 17, 1960 || Palomar || PLS || — || align=right | 2.7 km || 
|-id=652 bgcolor=#fefefe
| 30652 || 1236 T-1 || — || March 25, 1971 || Palomar || PLS || — || align=right | 2.4 km || 
|-id=653 bgcolor=#E9E9E9
| 30653 || 2190 T-1 || — || March 25, 1971 || Palomar || PLS || — || align=right | 2.8 km || 
|-id=654 bgcolor=#E9E9E9
| 30654 || 2234 T-1 || — || March 25, 1971 || Palomar || PLS || — || align=right | 5.1 km || 
|-id=655 bgcolor=#E9E9E9
| 30655 || 2289 T-1 || — || March 25, 1971 || Palomar || PLS || GEF || align=right | 5.5 km || 
|-id=656 bgcolor=#d6d6d6
| 30656 || 3098 T-1 || — || March 26, 1971 || Palomar || PLS || — || align=right | 18 km || 
|-id=657 bgcolor=#E9E9E9
| 30657 || 3258 T-1 || — || March 26, 1971 || Palomar || PLS || HEN || align=right | 4.2 km || 
|-id=658 bgcolor=#E9E9E9
| 30658 || 4042 T-1 || — || March 26, 1971 || Palomar || PLS || — || align=right | 3.8 km || 
|-id=659 bgcolor=#d6d6d6
| 30659 || 4109 T-1 || — || March 26, 1971 || Palomar || PLS || THM || align=right | 9.0 km || 
|-id=660 bgcolor=#fefefe
| 30660 || 4142 T-1 || — || March 26, 1971 || Palomar || PLS || FLO || align=right | 1.5 km || 
|-id=661 bgcolor=#d6d6d6
| 30661 || 4166 T-1 || — || March 26, 1971 || Palomar || PLS || — || align=right | 9.5 km || 
|-id=662 bgcolor=#d6d6d6
| 30662 || 4256 T-1 || — || March 26, 1971 || Palomar || PLS || — || align=right | 12 km || 
|-id=663 bgcolor=#fefefe
| 30663 || 1026 T-2 || — || September 29, 1973 || Palomar || PLS || — || align=right | 2.5 km || 
|-id=664 bgcolor=#fefefe
| 30664 || 1040 T-2 || — || September 29, 1973 || Palomar || PLS || — || align=right | 2.3 km || 
|-id=665 bgcolor=#fefefe
| 30665 || 1144 T-2 || — || September 29, 1973 || Palomar || PLS || NYS || align=right | 2.4 km || 
|-id=666 bgcolor=#E9E9E9
| 30666 || 1156 T-2 || — || September 29, 1973 || Palomar || PLS || — || align=right | 2.6 km || 
|-id=667 bgcolor=#E9E9E9
| 30667 || 1177 T-2 || — || September 29, 1973 || Palomar || PLS || — || align=right | 3.4 km || 
|-id=668 bgcolor=#fefefe
| 30668 || 1227 T-2 || — || September 29, 1973 || Palomar || PLS || — || align=right | 5.8 km || 
|-id=669 bgcolor=#fefefe
| 30669 || 1234 T-2 || — || September 29, 1973 || Palomar || PLS || FLO || align=right | 1.7 km || 
|-id=670 bgcolor=#d6d6d6
| 30670 || 1283 T-2 || — || September 29, 1973 || Palomar || PLS || THM || align=right | 7.7 km || 
|-id=671 bgcolor=#E9E9E9
| 30671 || 1314 T-2 || — || September 29, 1973 || Palomar || PLS || — || align=right | 2.6 km || 
|-id=672 bgcolor=#d6d6d6
| 30672 || 1346 T-2 || — || September 29, 1973 || Palomar || PLS || — || align=right | 8.2 km || 
|-id=673 bgcolor=#d6d6d6
| 30673 || 1409 T-2 || — || September 30, 1973 || Palomar || PLS || THM || align=right | 3.5 km || 
|-id=674 bgcolor=#E9E9E9
| 30674 || 1455 T-2 || — || September 30, 1973 || Palomar || PLS || PAD || align=right | 7.7 km || 
|-id=675 bgcolor=#E9E9E9
| 30675 || 2042 T-2 || — || September 29, 1973 || Palomar || PLS || — || align=right | 3.6 km || 
|-id=676 bgcolor=#fefefe
| 30676 || 2201 T-2 || — || September 29, 1973 || Palomar || PLS || FLO || align=right | 2.8 km || 
|-id=677 bgcolor=#E9E9E9
| 30677 || 2231 T-2 || — || September 29, 1973 || Palomar || PLS || GEF || align=right | 2.5 km || 
|-id=678 bgcolor=#fefefe
| 30678 || 2265 T-2 || — || September 29, 1973 || Palomar || PLS || — || align=right | 1.6 km || 
|-id=679 bgcolor=#fefefe
| 30679 || 2303 T-2 || — || September 29, 1973 || Palomar || PLS || EUT || align=right | 2.0 km || 
|-id=680 bgcolor=#E9E9E9
| 30680 || 3029 T-2 || — || September 30, 1973 || Palomar || PLS || AST || align=right | 4.3 km || 
|-id=681 bgcolor=#fefefe
| 30681 || 3084 T-2 || — || September 30, 1973 || Palomar || PLS || V || align=right | 2.0 km || 
|-id=682 bgcolor=#d6d6d6
| 30682 || 3209 T-2 || — || September 30, 1973 || Palomar || PLS || HYG || align=right | 9.7 km || 
|-id=683 bgcolor=#d6d6d6
| 30683 || 3211 T-2 || — || September 30, 1973 || Palomar || PLS || THM || align=right | 8.2 km || 
|-id=684 bgcolor=#d6d6d6
| 30684 || 3237 T-2 || — || September 30, 1973 || Palomar || PLS || LIX || align=right | 7.3 km || 
|-id=685 bgcolor=#fefefe
| 30685 || 3243 T-2 || — || September 30, 1973 || Palomar || PLS || — || align=right | 1.5 km || 
|-id=686 bgcolor=#d6d6d6
| 30686 || 3288 T-2 || — || September 30, 1973 || Palomar || PLS || THM || align=right | 9.0 km || 
|-id=687 bgcolor=#fefefe
| 30687 || 3347 T-2 || — || September 25, 1973 || Palomar || PLS || — || align=right | 1.7 km || 
|-id=688 bgcolor=#E9E9E9
| 30688 || 4194 T-2 || — || September 29, 1973 || Palomar || PLS || — || align=right | 5.9 km || 
|-id=689 bgcolor=#fefefe
| 30689 || 4318 T-2 || — || September 29, 1973 || Palomar || PLS || FLO || align=right | 2.3 km || 
|-id=690 bgcolor=#E9E9E9
| 30690 || 4633 T-2 || — || September 30, 1973 || Palomar || PLS || — || align=right | 5.0 km || 
|-id=691 bgcolor=#E9E9E9
| 30691 || 4810 T-2 || — || September 25, 1973 || Palomar || PLS || GEF || align=right | 3.2 km || 
|-id=692 bgcolor=#E9E9E9
| 30692 || 5040 T-2 || — || September 25, 1973 || Palomar || PLS || GER || align=right | 3.4 km || 
|-id=693 bgcolor=#E9E9E9
| 30693 || 5069 T-2 || — || September 25, 1973 || Palomar || PLS || DOR || align=right | 9.5 km || 
|-id=694 bgcolor=#d6d6d6
| 30694 || 5112 T-2 || — || September 25, 1973 || Palomar || PLS || — || align=right | 8.6 km || 
|-id=695 bgcolor=#fefefe
| 30695 || 1020 T-3 || — || October 17, 1977 || Palomar || PLS || V || align=right | 1.9 km || 
|-id=696 bgcolor=#fefefe
| 30696 || 1110 T-3 || — || October 17, 1977 || Palomar || PLS || — || align=right | 3.2 km || 
|-id=697 bgcolor=#E9E9E9
| 30697 || 2137 T-3 || — || October 16, 1977 || Palomar || PLS || — || align=right | 3.6 km || 
|-id=698 bgcolor=#C2FFFF
| 30698 Hippokoon || 2299 T-3 ||  || October 16, 1977 || Palomar || PLS || L5 || align=right | 18 km || 
|-id=699 bgcolor=#fefefe
| 30699 || 2356 T-3 || — || October 16, 1977 || Palomar || PLS || — || align=right | 2.5 km || 
|-id=700 bgcolor=#fefefe
| 30700 || 2367 T-3 || — || October 16, 1977 || Palomar || PLS || FLO || align=right | 3.1 km || 
|}

30701–30800 

|-bgcolor=#fefefe
| 30701 || 2381 T-3 || — || October 16, 1977 || Palomar || PLS || — || align=right | 1.8 km || 
|-id=702 bgcolor=#fefefe
| 30702 || 3042 T-3 || — || October 16, 1977 || Palomar || PLS || — || align=right | 3.1 km || 
|-id=703 bgcolor=#fefefe
| 30703 || 3101 T-3 || — || October 16, 1977 || Palomar || PLS || — || align=right | 3.5 km || 
|-id=704 bgcolor=#C2FFFF
| 30704 Phegeus || 3250 T-3 ||  || October 16, 1977 || Palomar || PLS || L5 || align=right | 27 km || 
|-id=705 bgcolor=#C2FFFF
| 30705 Idaios || 3365 T-3 ||  || October 16, 1977 || Palomar || PLS || L5 || align=right | 45 km || 
|-id=706 bgcolor=#fefefe
| 30706 || 4026 T-3 || — || October 16, 1977 || Palomar || PLS || — || align=right | 2.4 km || 
|-id=707 bgcolor=#fefefe
| 30707 || 4075 T-3 || — || October 16, 1977 || Palomar || PLS || — || align=right | 5.5 km || 
|-id=708 bgcolor=#C2FFFF
| 30708 Echepolos || 4101 T-3 ||  || October 16, 1977 || Palomar || PLS || L5 || align=right | 25 km || 
|-id=709 bgcolor=#fefefe
| 30709 || 4107 T-3 || — || October 16, 1977 || Palomar || PLS || — || align=right | 1.8 km || 
|-id=710 bgcolor=#d6d6d6
| 30710 || 4137 T-3 || — || October 16, 1977 || Palomar || PLS || — || align=right | 5.8 km || 
|-id=711 bgcolor=#fefefe
| 30711 || 4186 T-3 || — || October 16, 1977 || Palomar || PLS || — || align=right | 2.0 km || 
|-id=712 bgcolor=#d6d6d6
| 30712 || 4207 T-3 || — || October 16, 1977 || Palomar || PLS || — || align=right | 9.5 km || 
|-id=713 bgcolor=#fefefe
| 30713 || 4216 T-3 || — || October 16, 1977 || Palomar || PLS || — || align=right | 1.8 km || 
|-id=714 bgcolor=#E9E9E9
| 30714 || 4282 T-3 || — || October 16, 1977 || Palomar || PLS || AER || align=right | 2.9 km || 
|-id=715 bgcolor=#d6d6d6
| 30715 || 5034 T-3 || — || October 16, 1977 || Palomar || PLS || BRA || align=right | 5.9 km || 
|-id=716 bgcolor=#fefefe
| 30716 || 5107 T-3 || — || October 16, 1977 || Palomar || PLS || FLO || align=right | 2.1 km || 
|-id=717 bgcolor=#FA8072
| 30717 || 1937 UD || — || October 26, 1937 || Heidelberg || K. Reinmuth || — || align=right | 2.9 km || 
|-id=718 bgcolor=#E9E9E9
| 30718 Records ||  ||  || September 14, 1955 || Brooklyn || Indiana University || — || align=right | 9.2 km || 
|-id=719 bgcolor=#d6d6d6
| 30719 Isserstedt || 1963 RJ ||  || September 13, 1963 || Tautenburg Observatory || K. W. Kamper || — || align=right | 9.3 km || 
|-id=720 bgcolor=#d6d6d6
| 30720 || 1969 GB || — || April 9, 1969 || El Leoncito || C. U. Cesco || — || align=right | 12 km || 
|-id=721 bgcolor=#d6d6d6
| 30721 ||  || — || September 30, 1975 || Palomar || S. J. Bus || EOS || align=right | 5.5 km || 
|-id=722 bgcolor=#E9E9E9
| 30722 Biblioran ||  ||  || September 6, 1978 || Nauchnij || N. S. Chernykh || — || align=right | 3.3 km || 
|-id=723 bgcolor=#d6d6d6
| 30723 ||  || — || September 2, 1978 || La Silla || C.-I. Lagerkvist || — || align=right | 8.1 km || 
|-id=724 bgcolor=#d6d6d6
| 30724 Peterburgtrista ||  ||  || September 26, 1978 || Nauchnij || L. V. Zhuravleva || ALA || align=right | 21 km || 
|-id=725 bgcolor=#fefefe
| 30725 Klimov ||  ||  || September 26, 1978 || Nauchnij || L. V. Zhuravleva || NYS || align=right | 7.5 km || 
|-id=726 bgcolor=#fefefe
| 30726 ||  || — || November 7, 1978 || Palomar || E. F. Helin, S. J. Bus || — || align=right | 2.9 km || 
|-id=727 bgcolor=#fefefe
| 30727 ||  || — || June 25, 1979 || Siding Spring || E. F. Helin, S. J. Bus || NYS || align=right | 1.2 km || 
|-id=728 bgcolor=#d6d6d6
| 30728 ||  || — || August 22, 1979 || La Silla || C.-I. Lagerkvist || — || align=right | 6.2 km || 
|-id=729 bgcolor=#fefefe
| 30729 || 1980 TA || — || October 11, 1980 || Harvard Observatory || Harvard Obs. || FLO || align=right | 4.7 km || 
|-id=730 bgcolor=#d6d6d6
| 30730 || 1981 DL || — || February 28, 1981 || Siding Spring || S. J. Bus || — || align=right | 7.1 km || 
|-id=731 bgcolor=#E9E9E9
| 30731 ||  || — || March 2, 1981 || Siding Spring || S. J. Bus || GEF || align=right | 4.6 km || 
|-id=732 bgcolor=#fefefe
| 30732 ||  || — || March 2, 1981 || Siding Spring || S. J. Bus || V || align=right | 2.4 km || 
|-id=733 bgcolor=#E9E9E9
| 30733 ||  || — || March 2, 1981 || Siding Spring || S. J. Bus || ADE || align=right | 8.6 km || 
|-id=734 bgcolor=#E9E9E9
| 30734 ||  || — || March 2, 1981 || Siding Spring || S. J. Bus || EUN || align=right | 4.6 km || 
|-id=735 bgcolor=#fefefe
| 30735 ||  || — || March 6, 1981 || Siding Spring || S. J. Bus || V || align=right | 1.7 km || 
|-id=736 bgcolor=#fefefe
| 30736 ||  || — || March 1, 1981 || Siding Spring || S. J. Bus || V || align=right | 1.8 km || 
|-id=737 bgcolor=#d6d6d6
| 30737 ||  || — || March 1, 1981 || Siding Spring || S. J. Bus || — || align=right | 8.3 km || 
|-id=738 bgcolor=#fefefe
| 30738 ||  || — || March 7, 1981 || Siding Spring || S. J. Bus || NYS || align=right | 2.8 km || 
|-id=739 bgcolor=#fefefe
| 30739 ||  || — || March 1, 1981 || Siding Spring || S. J. Bus || — || align=right | 3.4 km || 
|-id=740 bgcolor=#d6d6d6
| 30740 ||  || — || March 1, 1981 || Siding Spring || S. J. Bus || — || align=right | 6.8 km || 
|-id=741 bgcolor=#E9E9E9
| 30741 ||  || — || March 1, 1981 || Siding Spring || S. J. Bus || — || align=right | 3.7 km || 
|-id=742 bgcolor=#d6d6d6
| 30742 ||  || — || March 1, 1981 || Siding Spring || S. J. Bus || — || align=right | 8.7 km || 
|-id=743 bgcolor=#fefefe
| 30743 ||  || — || March 1, 1981 || Siding Spring || S. J. Bus || — || align=right | 4.2 km || 
|-id=744 bgcolor=#d6d6d6
| 30744 ||  || — || March 2, 1981 || Siding Spring || S. J. Bus || HYG || align=right | 5.1 km || 
|-id=745 bgcolor=#d6d6d6
| 30745 ||  || — || March 2, 1981 || Siding Spring || S. J. Bus || THM || align=right | 6.1 km || 
|-id=746 bgcolor=#E9E9E9
| 30746 ||  || — || March 7, 1981 || Siding Spring || S. J. Bus || — || align=right | 6.0 km || 
|-id=747 bgcolor=#fefefe
| 30747 ||  || — || March 2, 1981 || Siding Spring || S. J. Bus || NYS || align=right | 1.6 km || 
|-id=748 bgcolor=#fefefe
| 30748 ||  || — || March 2, 1981 || Siding Spring || S. J. Bus || — || align=right | 2.8 km || 
|-id=749 bgcolor=#fefefe
| 30749 ||  || — || March 2, 1981 || Siding Spring || S. J. Bus || V || align=right | 2.2 km || 
|-id=750 bgcolor=#E9E9E9
| 30750 ||  || — || March 1, 1981 || Siding Spring || S. J. Bus || — || align=right | 5.3 km || 
|-id=751 bgcolor=#fefefe
| 30751 ||  || — || March 1, 1981 || Siding Spring || S. J. Bus || — || align=right | 2.2 km || 
|-id=752 bgcolor=#fefefe
| 30752 ||  || — || March 1, 1981 || Siding Spring || S. J. Bus || V || align=right | 1.6 km || 
|-id=753 bgcolor=#E9E9E9
| 30753 ||  || — || March 1, 1981 || Siding Spring || S. J. Bus || — || align=right | 3.4 km || 
|-id=754 bgcolor=#fefefe
| 30754 ||  || — || March 2, 1981 || Siding Spring || S. J. Bus || — || align=right | 2.2 km || 
|-id=755 bgcolor=#E9E9E9
| 30755 ||  || — || March 2, 1981 || Siding Spring || S. J. Bus || HEN || align=right | 2.8 km || 
|-id=756 bgcolor=#d6d6d6
| 30756 ||  || — || March 2, 1981 || Siding Spring || S. J. Bus || HYG || align=right | 8.2 km || 
|-id=757 bgcolor=#d6d6d6
| 30757 ||  || — || March 2, 1981 || Siding Spring || S. J. Bus || THM || align=right | 5.4 km || 
|-id=758 bgcolor=#E9E9E9
| 30758 ||  || — || March 2, 1981 || Siding Spring || S. J. Bus || — || align=right | 3.9 km || 
|-id=759 bgcolor=#E9E9E9
| 30759 ||  || — || March 2, 1981 || Siding Spring || S. J. Bus || — || align=right | 3.0 km || 
|-id=760 bgcolor=#fefefe
| 30760 ||  || — || March 2, 1981 || Siding Spring || S. J. Bus || NYS || align=right | 1.1 km || 
|-id=761 bgcolor=#E9E9E9
| 30761 ||  || — || March 2, 1981 || Siding Spring || S. J. Bus || — || align=right | 4.1 km || 
|-id=762 bgcolor=#E9E9E9
| 30762 ||  || — || March 2, 1981 || Siding Spring || S. J. Bus || — || align=right | 5.0 km || 
|-id=763 bgcolor=#fefefe
| 30763 ||  || — || March 2, 1981 || Siding Spring || S. J. Bus || V || align=right | 1.3 km || 
|-id=764 bgcolor=#d6d6d6
| 30764 ||  || — || March 2, 1981 || Siding Spring || S. J. Bus || SHU3:2 || align=right | 12 km || 
|-id=765 bgcolor=#FA8072
| 30765 ||  || — || March 6, 1981 || Siding Spring || S. J. Bus || — || align=right | 2.1 km || 
|-id=766 bgcolor=#d6d6d6
| 30766 ||  || — || October 24, 1981 || Palomar || S. J. Bus || — || align=right | 9.2 km || 
|-id=767 bgcolor=#FA8072
| 30767 Chriskraft ||  ||  || November 6, 1983 || Palomar || C. S. Shoemaker, E. M. Shoemaker || — || align=right | 3.4 km || 
|-id=768 bgcolor=#d6d6d6
| 30768 || 1983 YK || — || December 29, 1983 || Pino Torinese || G. Massone, G. DeSanctis || — || align=right | 18 km || 
|-id=769 bgcolor=#fefefe
| 30769 ||  || — || September 25, 1984 || Anderson Mesa || B. A. Skiff || FLO || align=right | 3.2 km || 
|-id=770 bgcolor=#fefefe
| 30770 ||  || — || September 27, 1984 || Kleť || A. Mrkos || — || align=right | 5.4 km || 
|-id=771 bgcolor=#FA8072
| 30771 ||  || — || August 1, 1986 || Palomar || E. F. Helin || — || align=right | 3.4 km || 
|-id=772 bgcolor=#fefefe
| 30772 ||  || — || September 2, 1986 || Kleť || A. Mrkos || ERI || align=right | 6.3 km || 
|-id=773 bgcolor=#fefefe
| 30773 Schelde ||  ||  || September 6, 1986 || Smolyan || E. W. Elst || — || align=right | 10 km || 
|-id=774 bgcolor=#fefefe
| 30774 ||  || — || January 25, 1987 || La Silla || E. W. Elst || — || align=right | 5.4 km || 
|-id=775 bgcolor=#FA8072
| 30775 Lattu || 1987 QX ||  || August 24, 1987 || Palomar || E. F. Helin || — || align=right | 3.5 km || 
|-id=776 bgcolor=#fefefe
| 30776 || 1987 QY || — || August 24, 1987 || Palomar || E. F. Helin || PHO || align=right | 2.7 km || 
|-id=777 bgcolor=#fefefe
| 30777 ||  || — || September 21, 1987 || Smolyan || E. W. Elst || FLO || align=right | 3.6 km || 
|-id=778 bgcolor=#E9E9E9
| 30778 Döblin ||  ||  || September 29, 1987 || Tautenburg Observatory || F. Börngen || — || align=right | 7.3 km || 
|-id=779 bgcolor=#fefefe
| 30779 Sankt-Stephan ||  ||  || October 17, 1987 || Palomar || C. S. Shoemaker, E. M. Shoemaker || PHO || align=right | 2.6 km || 
|-id=780 bgcolor=#fefefe
| 30780 ||  || — || February 11, 1988 || La Silla || E. W. Elst || V || align=right | 2.2 km || 
|-id=781 bgcolor=#fefefe
| 30781 ||  || — || February 11, 1988 || La Silla || E. W. Elst || — || align=right | 3.2 km || 
|-id=782 bgcolor=#d6d6d6
| 30782 ||  || — || February 13, 1988 || La Silla || E. W. Elst || — || align=right | 7.6 km || 
|-id=783 bgcolor=#fefefe
| 30783 ||  || — || February 13, 1988 || La Silla || E. W. Elst || — || align=right | 2.7 km || 
|-id=784 bgcolor=#E9E9E9
| 30784 || 1988 PO || — || August 11, 1988 || Palomar || C. Mikolajczak, R. Coker || — || align=right | 6.3 km || 
|-id=785 bgcolor=#FA8072
| 30785 Greeley || 1988 PX ||  || August 13, 1988 || Palomar || C. S. Shoemaker, E. M. Shoemaker || — || align=right | 1.4 km || 
|-id=786 bgcolor=#FA8072
| 30786 Karkoschka || 1988 QC ||  || August 18, 1988 || Palomar || C. S. Shoemaker, E. M. Shoemaker || — || align=right | 1.6 km || 
|-id=787 bgcolor=#E9E9E9
| 30787 || 1988 RC || — || September 7, 1988 || Brorfelde || P. Jensen || — || align=right | 11 km || 
|-id=788 bgcolor=#E9E9E9
| 30788 Angekauffmann ||  ||  || September 8, 1988 || Tautenburg Observatory || F. Börngen || — || align=right | 15 km || 
|-id=789 bgcolor=#E9E9E9
| 30789 ||  || — || September 3, 1988 || La Silla || H. Debehogne || — || align=right | 8.9 km || 
|-id=790 bgcolor=#E9E9E9
| 30790 ||  || — || September 14, 1988 || Cerro Tololo || S. J. Bus || — || align=right | 2.6 km || 
|-id=791 bgcolor=#C2FFFF
| 30791 ||  || — || September 14, 1988 || Cerro Tololo || S. J. Bus || L5 || align=right | 20 km || 
|-id=792 bgcolor=#C2FFFF
| 30792 ||  || — || September 14, 1988 || Cerro Tololo || S. J. Bus || L5 || align=right | 18 km || 
|-id=793 bgcolor=#C2FFFF
| 30793 ||  || — || September 16, 1988 || Cerro Tololo || S. J. Bus || L5 || align=right | 19 km || 
|-id=794 bgcolor=#E9E9E9
| 30794 ||  || — || October 15, 1988 || Gekko || Y. Oshima || EUN || align=right | 4.3 km || 
|-id=795 bgcolor=#E9E9E9
| 30795 ||  || — || January 4, 1989 || Siding Spring || R. H. McNaught || — || align=right | 5.3 km || 
|-id=796 bgcolor=#E9E9E9
| 30796 ||  || — || February 4, 1989 || La Silla || E. W. Elst || — || align=right | 3.5 km || 
|-id=797 bgcolor=#E9E9E9
| 30797 Chimborazo ||  ||  || February 4, 1989 || La Silla || E. W. Elst || — || align=right | 5.4 km || 
|-id=798 bgcolor=#E9E9E9
| 30798 Graubünden ||  ||  || February 2, 1989 || Tautenburg Observatory || F. Börngen || — || align=right | 8.8 km || 
|-id=799 bgcolor=#fefefe
| 30799 || 1989 LH || — || June 4, 1989 || Palomar || E. F. Helin || — || align=right | 6.4 km || 
|-id=800 bgcolor=#FA8072
| 30800 || 1989 ST || — || September 29, 1989 || Kushiro || S. Ueda, H. Kaneda || — || align=right | 3.4 km || 
|}

30801–30900 

|-bgcolor=#E9E9E9
| 30801 ||  || — || September 26, 1989 || La Silla || E. W. Elst || — || align=right | 2.8 km || 
|-id=802 bgcolor=#fefefe
| 30802 ||  || — || September 26, 1989 || La Silla || E. W. Elst || — || align=right | 3.4 km || 
|-id=803 bgcolor=#E9E9E9
| 30803 ||  || — || September 26, 1989 || Calar Alto || J. M. Baur, K. Birkle || — || align=right | 3.5 km || 
|-id=804 bgcolor=#d6d6d6
| 30804 ||  || — || October 2, 1989 || La Silla || H. Debehogne || THM || align=right | 8.7 km || 
|-id=805 bgcolor=#E9E9E9
| 30805 ||  || — || October 21, 1989 || Kitami || K. Endate, K. Watanabe || — || align=right | 2.5 km || 
|-id=806 bgcolor=#C2FFFF
| 30806 ||  || — || October 30, 1989 || Cerro Tololo || S. J. Bus || L5 || align=right | 13 km || 
|-id=807 bgcolor=#C2FFFF
| 30807 ||  || — || October 30, 1989 || Cerro Tololo || S. J. Bus || L5 || align=right | 21 km || 
|-id=808 bgcolor=#E9E9E9
| 30808 ||  || — || December 30, 1989 || Siding Spring || R. H. McNaught || — || align=right | 3.9 km || 
|-id=809 bgcolor=#E9E9E9
| 30809 ||  || — || March 7, 1990 || La Silla || H. Debehogne || — || align=right | 9.2 km || 
|-id=810 bgcolor=#E9E9E9
| 30810 || 1990 FM || — || March 23, 1990 || Palomar || E. F. Helin || — || align=right | 10 km || 
|-id=811 bgcolor=#fefefe
| 30811 ||  || — || July 29, 1990 || Palomar || H. E. Holt || FLO || align=right | 2.4 km || 
|-id=812 bgcolor=#fefefe
| 30812 ||  || — || July 25, 1990 || Palomar || H. E. Holt || FLO || align=right | 1.4 km || 
|-id=813 bgcolor=#fefefe
| 30813 || 1990 QT || — || August 19, 1990 || Palomar || E. F. Helin || — || align=right | 4.3 km || 
|-id=814 bgcolor=#fefefe
| 30814 || 1990 QW || — || August 19, 1990 || Palomar || E. F. Helin || V || align=right | 3.7 km || 
|-id=815 bgcolor=#fefefe
| 30815 ||  || — || August 22, 1990 || Palomar || H. E. Holt || FLO || align=right | 2.5 km || 
|-id=816 bgcolor=#fefefe
| 30816 ||  || — || August 29, 1990 || Palomar || H. E. Holt || FLO || align=right | 2.9 km || 
|-id=817 bgcolor=#fefefe
| 30817 ||  || — || August 16, 1990 || La Silla || E. W. Elst || FLO || align=right | 3.4 km || 
|-id=818 bgcolor=#fefefe
| 30818 ||  || — || September 14, 1990 || Palomar || H. E. Holt || V || align=right | 2.1 km || 
|-id=819 bgcolor=#fefefe
| 30819 ||  || — || September 15, 1990 || Palomar || C. M. Olmstead || — || align=right | 5.8 km || 
|-id=820 bgcolor=#fefefe
| 30820 ||  || — || September 15, 1990 || Palomar || H. E. Holt || FLO || align=right | 2.4 km || 
|-id=821 bgcolor=#fefefe
| 30821 Chernetenko ||  ||  || September 15, 1990 || Nauchnij || L. V. Zhuravleva || FLO || align=right | 3.6 km || 
|-id=822 bgcolor=#fefefe
| 30822 ||  || — || September 22, 1990 || La Silla || E. W. Elst || — || align=right | 2.4 km || 
|-id=823 bgcolor=#fefefe
| 30823 ||  || — || September 16, 1990 || Palomar || H. E. Holt || Vfast? || align=right | 2.5 km || 
|-id=824 bgcolor=#fefefe
| 30824 || 1990 TD || — || October 9, 1990 || Siding Spring || R. H. McNaught || FLO || align=right | 3.6 km || 
|-id=825 bgcolor=#FFC2E0
| 30825 ||  || — || October 14, 1990 || Kitt Peak || Spacewatch || APO +1km || align=right | 4.1 km || 
|-id=826 bgcolor=#d6d6d6
| 30826 Coulomb ||  ||  || October 10, 1990 || Tautenburg Observatory || F. Börngen, L. D. Schmadel || — || align=right | 11 km || 
|-id=827 bgcolor=#fefefe
| 30827 Lautenschläger ||  ||  || October 10, 1990 || Tautenburg Observatory || L. D. Schmadel, F. Börngen || — || align=right | 2.6 km || 
|-id=828 bgcolor=#fefefe
| 30828 Bethe ||  ||  || October 12, 1990 || Tautenburg Observatory || F. Börngen, L. D. Schmadel || — || align=right | 4.4 km || 
|-id=829 bgcolor=#fefefe
| 30829 Wolfwacker ||  ||  || October 10, 1990 || Tautenburg Observatory || L. D. Schmadel, F. Börngen || FLO || align=right | 3.1 km || 
|-id=830 bgcolor=#fefefe
| 30830 Jahn ||  ||  || October 14, 1990 || Tautenburg Observatory || F. Börngen, L. D. Schmadel || ERI || align=right | 4.0 km || 
|-id=831 bgcolor=#fefefe
| 30831 Seignovert ||  ||  || October 14, 1990 || Palomar || K. J. Lawrence, E. F. Helin || H || align=right | 1.9 km || 
|-id=832 bgcolor=#fefefe
| 30832 Urbaincreve ||  ||  || October 16, 1990 || La Silla || E. W. Elst || — || align=right | 3.5 km || 
|-id=833 bgcolor=#fefefe
| 30833 ||  || — || November 15, 1990 || La Silla || E. W. Elst || V || align=right | 1.8 km || 
|-id=834 bgcolor=#fefefe
| 30834 ||  || — || November 15, 1990 || La Silla || E. W. Elst || V || align=right | 2.8 km || 
|-id=835 bgcolor=#fefefe
| 30835 Waterloo ||  ||  || November 21, 1990 || La Silla || E. W. Elst || — || align=right | 2.7 km || 
|-id=836 bgcolor=#fefefe
| 30836 Schnittke ||  ||  || January 15, 1991 || Tautenburg Observatory || F. Börngen || — || align=right | 2.6 km || 
|-id=837 bgcolor=#d6d6d6
| 30837 Steinheil ||  ||  || January 15, 1991 || Tautenburg Observatory || F. Börngen || — || align=right | 11 km || 
|-id=838 bgcolor=#fefefe
| 30838 Hitomiyamasaki ||  ||  || February 7, 1991 || Geisei || T. Seki || — || align=right | 2.8 km || 
|-id=839 bgcolor=#fefefe
| 30839 ||  || — || April 11, 1991 || Kushiro || S. Ueda, H. Kaneda || NYS || align=right | 4.9 km || 
|-id=840 bgcolor=#E9E9E9
| 30840 Jackalice ||  ||  || April 15, 1991 || Palomar || C. S. Shoemaker, D. H. Levy || — || align=right | 4.7 km || 
|-id=841 bgcolor=#fefefe
| 30841 ||  || — || April 8, 1991 || La Silla || E. W. Elst || — || align=right | 2.3 km || 
|-id=842 bgcolor=#E9E9E9
| 30842 ||  || — || April 8, 1991 || La Silla || E. W. Elst || — || align=right | 3.2 km || 
|-id=843 bgcolor=#E9E9E9
| 30843 ||  || — || May 8, 1991 || Palomar || E. F. Helin || — || align=right | 8.5 km || 
|-id=844 bgcolor=#E9E9E9
| 30844 Hukeller || 1991 KE ||  || May 17, 1991 || Palomar || C. S. Shoemaker, E. M. Shoemaker || — || align=right | 11 km || 
|-id=845 bgcolor=#E9E9E9
| 30845 ||  || — || August 2, 1991 || La Silla || E. W. Elst || AGN || align=right | 3.8 km || 
|-id=846 bgcolor=#fefefe
| 30846 ||  || — || August 9, 1991 || Palomar || H. E. Holt || — || align=right | 2.0 km || 
|-id=847 bgcolor=#d6d6d6
| 30847 Lampert ||  ||  || September 13, 1991 || Tautenburg Observatory || L. D. Schmadel, F. Börngen || EOS || align=right | 10 km || 
|-id=848 bgcolor=#E9E9E9
| 30848 ||  || — || September 14, 1991 || Palomar || H. E. Holt || GEF || align=right | 5.2 km || 
|-id=849 bgcolor=#E9E9E9
| 30849 ||  || — || September 14, 1991 || Palomar || H. E. Holt || — || align=right | 12 km || 
|-id=850 bgcolor=#E9E9E9
| 30850 Vonsiemens ||  ||  || October 7, 1991 || Tautenburg Observatory || F. Börngen, L. D. Schmadel || — || align=right | 9.7 km || 
|-id=851 bgcolor=#fefefe
| 30851 Reißfelder ||  ||  || October 2, 1991 || Tautenburg Observatory || L. D. Schmadel, F. Börngen || — || align=right | 2.1 km || 
|-id=852 bgcolor=#fefefe
| 30852 Debye ||  ||  || October 2, 1991 || Tautenburg Observatory || F. Börngen, L. D. Schmadel || — || align=right | 2.0 km || 
|-id=853 bgcolor=#d6d6d6
| 30853 ||  || — || October 31, 1991 || Kushiro || S. Ueda, H. Kaneda || — || align=right | 5.7 km || 
|-id=854 bgcolor=#FA8072
| 30854 || 1991 VB || — || November 1, 1991 || Palomar || E. F. Helin || — || align=right data-sort-value="0.94" | 940 m || 
|-id=855 bgcolor=#fefefe
| 30855 ||  || — || November 4, 1991 || Kitt Peak || Spacewatch || — || align=right | 2.4 km || 
|-id=856 bgcolor=#FA8072
| 30856 || 1991 XE || — || December 7, 1991 || Palomar || E. F. Helin || H || align=right | 3.4 km || 
|-id=857 bgcolor=#fefefe
| 30857 Parsec || 1991 YY ||  || December 31, 1991 || Haute Provence || E. W. Elst || — || align=right | 2.9 km || 
|-id=858 bgcolor=#fefefe
| 30858 ||  || — || January 9, 1992 || Palomar || E. F. Helin || PHO || align=right | 4.2 km || 
|-id=859 bgcolor=#fefefe
| 30859 || 1992 BM || — || January 28, 1992 || Kushiro || S. Ueda, H. Kaneda || — || align=right | 2.9 km || 
|-id=860 bgcolor=#fefefe
| 30860 ||  || — || February 29, 1992 || Kitt Peak || Spacewatch || NYS || align=right | 1.8 km || 
|-id=861 bgcolor=#d6d6d6
| 30861 ||  || — || February 29, 1992 || La Silla || UESAC || — || align=right | 6.2 km || 
|-id=862 bgcolor=#fefefe
| 30862 ||  || — || February 29, 1992 || La Silla || UESAC || FLO || align=right | 4.4 km || 
|-id=863 bgcolor=#fefefe
| 30863 ||  || — || March 1, 1992 || La Silla || UESAC || NYS || align=right | 2.3 km || 
|-id=864 bgcolor=#fefefe
| 30864 ||  || — || March 1, 1992 || La Silla || UESAC || V || align=right | 2.0 km || 
|-id=865 bgcolor=#d6d6d6
| 30865 ||  || — || March 2, 1992 || La Silla || UESAC || — || align=right | 4.1 km || 
|-id=866 bgcolor=#d6d6d6
| 30866 ||  || — || March 2, 1992 || La Silla || UESAC || — || align=right | 9.0 km || 
|-id=867 bgcolor=#d6d6d6
| 30867 ||  || — || March 2, 1992 || La Silla || UESAC || — || align=right | 7.0 km || 
|-id=868 bgcolor=#d6d6d6
| 30868 ||  || — || March 6, 1992 || La Silla || UESAC || — || align=right | 8.3 km || 
|-id=869 bgcolor=#fefefe
| 30869 ||  || — || March 6, 1992 || La Silla || UESAC || — || align=right | 2.5 km || 
|-id=870 bgcolor=#d6d6d6
| 30870 ||  || — || March 1, 1992 || La Silla || UESAC || — || align=right | 8.4 km || 
|-id=871 bgcolor=#d6d6d6
| 30871 ||  || — || March 1, 1992 || La Silla || UESAC || — || align=right | 6.5 km || 
|-id=872 bgcolor=#fefefe
| 30872 ||  || — || March 2, 1992 || La Silla || UESAC || — || align=right | 3.1 km || 
|-id=873 bgcolor=#fefefe
| 30873 ||  || — || March 2, 1992 || La Silla || UESAC || NYS || align=right | 2.1 km || 
|-id=874 bgcolor=#fefefe
| 30874 ||  || — || March 1, 1992 || La Silla || UESAC || V || align=right | 1.7 km || 
|-id=875 bgcolor=#d6d6d6
| 30875 ||  || — || March 8, 1992 || La Silla || UESAC || THM || align=right | 8.5 km || 
|-id=876 bgcolor=#d6d6d6
| 30876 ||  || — || March 4, 1992 || La Silla || UESAC || — || align=right | 7.2 km || 
|-id=877 bgcolor=#d6d6d6
| 30877 ||  || — || March 1, 1992 || La Silla || UESAC || ALA || align=right | 10 km || 
|-id=878 bgcolor=#d6d6d6
| 30878 || 1992 GQ || — || April 3, 1992 || Kushiro || S. Ueda, H. Kaneda || — || align=right | 9.7 km || 
|-id=879 bgcolor=#E9E9E9
| 30879 Hiroshikanai || 1992 KF ||  || May 25, 1992 || Geisei || T. Seki || — || align=right | 6.0 km || 
|-id=880 bgcolor=#E9E9E9
| 30880 ||  || — || August 2, 1992 || Palomar || H. E. Holt || — || align=right | 5.0 km || 
|-id=881 bgcolor=#E9E9E9
| 30881 Robertstevenson ||  ||  || September 2, 1992 || La Silla || E. W. Elst || — || align=right | 2.4 km || 
|-id=882 bgcolor=#E9E9E9
| 30882 Tomhenning ||  ||  || September 21, 1992 || Tautenburg Observatory || L. D. Schmadel, F. Börngen || EUN || align=right | 6.3 km || 
|-id=883 bgcolor=#E9E9E9
| 30883 de Broglie ||  ||  || September 24, 1992 || Tautenburg Observatory || F. Börngen, L. D. Schmadel || — || align=right | 4.0 km || 
|-id=884 bgcolor=#E9E9E9
| 30884 ||  || — || September 30, 1992 || Palomar || H. E. Holt || EUN || align=right | 4.9 km || 
|-id=885 bgcolor=#E9E9E9
| 30885 ||  || — || October 30, 1992 || Yakiimo || A. Natori, T. Urata || — || align=right | 6.1 km || 
|-id=886 bgcolor=#E9E9E9
| 30886 ||  || — || November 17, 1992 || Kitami || K. Endate, K. Watanabe || EUN || align=right | 5.7 km || 
|-id=887 bgcolor=#E9E9E9
| 30887 ||  || — || November 18, 1992 || Kushiro || S. Ueda, H. Kaneda || EUN || align=right | 6.4 km || 
|-id=888 bgcolor=#d6d6d6
| 30888 Okitsumisaki ||  ||  || January 19, 1993 || Geisei || T. Seki || — || align=right | 9.2 km || 
|-id=889 bgcolor=#d6d6d6
| 30889 ||  || — || March 17, 1993 || La Silla || UESAC || KOR || align=right | 4.7 km || 
|-id=890 bgcolor=#d6d6d6
| 30890 ||  || — || March 17, 1993 || La Silla || UESAC || — || align=right | 11 km || 
|-id=891 bgcolor=#fefefe
| 30891 ||  || — || March 17, 1993 || La Silla || UESAC || FLO || align=right | 2.6 km || 
|-id=892 bgcolor=#d6d6d6
| 30892 ||  || — || March 17, 1993 || La Silla || UESAC || — || align=right | 5.0 km || 
|-id=893 bgcolor=#fefefe
| 30893 ||  || — || March 17, 1993 || La Silla || UESAC || — || align=right | 2.1 km || 
|-id=894 bgcolor=#fefefe
| 30894 ||  || — || March 17, 1993 || La Silla || UESAC || FLO || align=right | 2.0 km || 
|-id=895 bgcolor=#fefefe
| 30895 ||  || — || March 21, 1993 || La Silla || UESAC || FLO || align=right | 3.2 km || 
|-id=896 bgcolor=#d6d6d6
| 30896 ||  || — || March 21, 1993 || La Silla || UESAC || — || align=right | 6.4 km || 
|-id=897 bgcolor=#d6d6d6
| 30897 ||  || — || March 21, 1993 || La Silla || UESAC || — || align=right | 5.7 km || 
|-id=898 bgcolor=#fefefe
| 30898 ||  || — || March 21, 1993 || La Silla || UESAC || — || align=right | 2.8 km || 
|-id=899 bgcolor=#d6d6d6
| 30899 ||  || — || March 21, 1993 || La Silla || UESAC || — || align=right | 7.2 km || 
|-id=900 bgcolor=#d6d6d6
| 30900 ||  || — || March 17, 1993 || La Silla || UESAC || HYG || align=right | 7.5 km || 
|}

30901–31000 

|-bgcolor=#fefefe
| 30901 ||  || — || March 19, 1993 || La Silla || UESAC || — || align=right | 1.6 km || 
|-id=902 bgcolor=#d6d6d6
| 30902 ||  || — || March 19, 1993 || La Silla || UESAC || — || align=right | 5.9 km || 
|-id=903 bgcolor=#fefefe
| 30903 ||  || — || March 19, 1993 || La Silla || UESAC || FLO || align=right | 4.3 km || 
|-id=904 bgcolor=#d6d6d6
| 30904 ||  || — || March 19, 1993 || La Silla || UESAC || — || align=right | 7.7 km || 
|-id=905 bgcolor=#d6d6d6
| 30905 ||  || — || March 19, 1993 || La Silla || UESAC || EOS || align=right | 7.9 km || 
|-id=906 bgcolor=#d6d6d6
| 30906 ||  || — || March 19, 1993 || La Silla || UESAC || THM || align=right | 11 km || 
|-id=907 bgcolor=#d6d6d6
| 30907 ||  || — || March 19, 1993 || La Silla || UESAC || THM || align=right | 6.5 km || 
|-id=908 bgcolor=#d6d6d6
| 30908 ||  || — || March 19, 1993 || La Silla || UESAC || HYG || align=right | 8.5 km || 
|-id=909 bgcolor=#fefefe
| 30909 ||  || — || March 19, 1993 || La Silla || UESAC || NYS || align=right | 1.7 km || 
|-id=910 bgcolor=#fefefe
| 30910 ||  || — || March 17, 1993 || La Silla || UESAC || NYS || align=right | 1.5 km || 
|-id=911 bgcolor=#fefefe
| 30911 ||  || — || March 21, 1993 || La Silla || UESAC || FLO || align=right | 2.3 km || 
|-id=912 bgcolor=#d6d6d6
| 30912 ||  || — || March 21, 1993 || La Silla || UESAC || — || align=right | 6.0 km || 
|-id=913 bgcolor=#d6d6d6
| 30913 ||  || — || March 21, 1993 || La Silla || UESAC || ALA || align=right | 7.8 km || 
|-id=914 bgcolor=#fefefe
| 30914 ||  || — || March 19, 1993 || La Silla || UESAC || — || align=right | 2.2 km || 
|-id=915 bgcolor=#d6d6d6
| 30915 ||  || — || April 15, 1993 || Palomar || H. E. Holt || — || align=right | 13 km || 
|-id=916 bgcolor=#fefefe
| 30916 ||  || — || April 14, 1993 || La Silla || H. Debehogne || — || align=right | 2.9 km || 
|-id=917 bgcolor=#d6d6d6
| 30917 Moehorgan ||  ||  || April 19, 1993 || McGraw-Hill || J. L. Tonry || — || align=right | 5.8 km || 
|-id=918 bgcolor=#fefefe
| 30918 ||  || — || May 27, 1993 || Caussols || E. W. Elst || V || align=right | 1.8 km || 
|-id=919 bgcolor=#fefefe
| 30919 ||  || — || July 12, 1993 || La Silla || E. W. Elst || — || align=right | 2.2 km || 
|-id=920 bgcolor=#fefefe
| 30920 ||  || — || July 20, 1993 || La Silla || E. W. Elst || — || align=right | 3.3 km || 
|-id=921 bgcolor=#fefefe
| 30921 ||  || — || July 20, 1993 || La Silla || E. W. Elst || NYS || align=right | 2.0 km || 
|-id=922 bgcolor=#fefefe
| 30922 ||  || — || July 19, 1993 || La Silla || E. W. Elst || — || align=right | 2.8 km || 
|-id=923 bgcolor=#E9E9E9
| 30923 ||  || — || August 18, 1993 || Caussols || E. W. Elst || — || align=right | 4.0 km || 
|-id=924 bgcolor=#E9E9E9
| 30924 ||  || — || September 15, 1993 || Kitami || K. Endate, K. Watanabe || — || align=right | 3.3 km || 
|-id=925 bgcolor=#E9E9E9
| 30925 ||  || — || September 15, 1993 || Kitami || K. Endate, K. Watanabe || — || align=right | 5.8 km || 
|-id=926 bgcolor=#fefefe
| 30926 ||  || — || October 14, 1993 || Palomar || H. E. Holt || — || align=right | 3.4 km || 
|-id=927 bgcolor=#fefefe
| 30927 ||  || — || October 9, 1993 || La Silla || E. W. Elst || — || align=right | 2.4 km || 
|-id=928 bgcolor=#E9E9E9
| 30928 Jefferson ||  ||  || October 9, 1993 || La Silla || E. W. Elst || — || align=right | 6.5 km || 
|-id=929 bgcolor=#E9E9E9
| 30929 ||  || — || October 9, 1993 || La Silla || E. W. Elst || EUN || align=right | 5.4 km || 
|-id=930 bgcolor=#fefefe
| 30930 || 1993 UF || — || October 20, 1993 || Siding Spring || R. H. McNaught || — || align=right | 3.1 km || 
|-id=931 bgcolor=#E9E9E9
| 30931 ||  || — || October 20, 1993 || La Silla || E. W. Elst || — || align=right | 2.6 km || 
|-id=932 bgcolor=#E9E9E9
| 30932 ||  || — || October 20, 1993 || La Silla || E. W. Elst || — || align=right | 3.6 km || 
|-id=933 bgcolor=#E9E9E9
| 30933 Grillparzer ||  ||  || October 17, 1993 || Tautenburg Observatory || F. Börngen || — || align=right | 3.5 km || 
|-id=934 bgcolor=#fefefe
| 30934 Bakerhansen || 1993 WH ||  || November 16, 1993 || Palomar || C. S. Shoemaker, D. H. Levy || H || align=right | 2.8 km || 
|-id=935 bgcolor=#fefefe
| 30935 Davasobel ||  ||  || January 8, 1994 || Palomar || C. S. Shoemaker, D. H. Levy || H || align=right | 2.4 km || 
|-id=936 bgcolor=#E9E9E9
| 30936 Basra ||  ||  || January 16, 1994 || Caussols || E. W. Elst, C. Pollas || EUN || align=right | 6.3 km || 
|-id=937 bgcolor=#E9E9E9
| 30937 Bashkirtseff ||  ||  || January 16, 1994 || Caussols || E. W. Elst, C. Pollas || — || align=right | 4.3 km || 
|-id=938 bgcolor=#E9E9E9
| 30938 Montmartre ||  ||  || January 16, 1994 || Caussols || E. W. Elst, C. Pollas || EUN || align=right | 4.0 km || 
|-id=939 bgcolor=#E9E9E9
| 30939 Samaritaine ||  ||  || January 16, 1994 || Caussols || E. W. Elst, C. Pollas || EUN || align=right | 5.0 km || 
|-id=940 bgcolor=#E9E9E9
| 30940 ||  || — || February 14, 1994 || Oizumi || T. Kobayashi || — || align=right | 4.8 km || 
|-id=941 bgcolor=#E9E9E9
| 30941 ||  || — || February 7, 1994 || La Silla || E. W. Elst || HNS || align=right | 4.1 km || 
|-id=942 bgcolor=#C2FFFF
| 30942 Helicaon ||  ||  || February 8, 1994 || La Silla || E. W. Elst || L5 || align=right | 33 km || 
|-id=943 bgcolor=#E9E9E9
| 30943 ||  || — || March 12, 1994 || Kitami || K. Endate, K. Watanabe || — || align=right | 10 km || 
|-id=944 bgcolor=#d6d6d6
| 30944 ||  || — || April 8, 1994 || Kitami || K. Endate, K. Watanabe || — || align=right | 9.4 km || 
|-id=945 bgcolor=#d6d6d6
| 30945 ||  || — || April 14, 1994 || Lake Tekapo || A. C. Gilmore, P. M. Kilmartin || EOS || align=right | 7.9 km || 
|-id=946 bgcolor=#fefefe
| 30946 || 1994 HB || — || April 19, 1994 || Kitt Peak || Spacewatch || — || align=right | 2.5 km || 
|-id=947 bgcolor=#E9E9E9
| 30947 || 1994 JW || — || May 4, 1994 || Palomar || E. F. Helin || EUN || align=right | 6.0 km || 
|-id=948 bgcolor=#fefefe
| 30948 || 1994 PU || — || August 14, 1994 || Oizumi || T. Kobayashi || FLO || align=right | 2.2 km || 
|-id=949 bgcolor=#d6d6d6
| 30949 ||  || — || August 10, 1994 || La Silla || E. W. Elst || THM || align=right | 7.8 km || 
|-id=950 bgcolor=#fefefe
| 30950 ||  || — || August 10, 1994 || La Silla || E. W. Elst || — || align=right | 2.1 km || 
|-id=951 bgcolor=#fefefe
| 30951 ||  || — || August 10, 1994 || La Silla || E. W. Elst || — || align=right | 1.9 km || 
|-id=952 bgcolor=#fefefe
| 30952 ||  || — || August 10, 1994 || La Silla || E. W. Elst || — || align=right | 2.1 km || 
|-id=953 bgcolor=#d6d6d6
| 30953 ||  || — || August 10, 1994 || La Silla || E. W. Elst || — || align=right | 6.6 km || 
|-id=954 bgcolor=#fefefe
| 30954 ||  || — || August 12, 1994 || La Silla || E. W. Elst || — || align=right | 1.7 km || 
|-id=955 bgcolor=#d6d6d6
| 30955 Weiser ||  ||  || August 12, 1994 || La Silla || E. W. Elst || — || align=right | 17 km || 
|-id=956 bgcolor=#d6d6d6
| 30956 || 1994 QP || — || August 27, 1994 || Siding Spring || G. J. Garradd || ALA || align=right | 12 km || 
|-id=957 bgcolor=#fefefe
| 30957 ||  || — || September 28, 1994 || Kitt Peak || Spacewatch || — || align=right | 1.9 km || 
|-id=958 bgcolor=#fefefe
| 30958 ||  || — || October 7, 1994 || Palomar || E. F. Helin || H || align=right | 1.9 km || 
|-id=959 bgcolor=#fefefe
| 30959 ||  || — || October 8, 1994 || Kitt Peak || Spacewatch || — || align=right | 1.8 km || 
|-id=960 bgcolor=#fefefe
| 30960 ||  || — || October 26, 1994 || Kushiro || S. Ueda, H. Kaneda || — || align=right | 2.2 km || 
|-id=961 bgcolor=#fefefe
| 30961 ||  || — || November 4, 1994 || Oizumi || T. Kobayashi || — || align=right | 3.1 km || 
|-id=962 bgcolor=#fefefe
| 30962 ||  || — || November 11, 1994 || Nyukasa || M. Hirasawa, S. Suzuki || FLO || align=right | 2.9 km || 
|-id=963 bgcolor=#FA8072
| 30963 Mount Banzan ||  ||  || November 29, 1994 || Ayashi Station || M. Koishikawa || PHO || align=right | 3.4 km || 
|-id=964 bgcolor=#fefefe
| 30964 ||  || — || November 28, 1994 || Kitt Peak || Spacewatch || FLO || align=right | 2.4 km || 
|-id=965 bgcolor=#fefefe
| 30965 || 1994 XW || — || December 2, 1994 || Nachi-Katsuura || Y. Shimizu, T. Urata || FLO || align=right | 2.6 km || 
|-id=966 bgcolor=#fefefe
| 30966 ||  || — || December 2, 1994 || Farra d'Isonzo || Farra d'Isonzo || FLO || align=right | 1.7 km || 
|-id=967 bgcolor=#fefefe
| 30967 ||  || — || December 9, 1994 || Oizumi || T. Kobayashi || V || align=right | 3.2 km || 
|-id=968 bgcolor=#fefefe
| 30968 ||  || — || January 6, 1995 || Nyukasa || M. Hirasawa, S. Suzuki || PHO || align=right | 3.1 km || 
|-id=969 bgcolor=#fefefe
| 30969 ||  || — || January 29, 1995 || Siding Spring || R. H. McNaught || — || align=right | 6.1 km || 
|-id=970 bgcolor=#E9E9E9
| 30970 ||  || — || January 31, 1995 || Oizumi || T. Kobayashi || — || align=right | 4.0 km || 
|-id=971 bgcolor=#fefefe
| 30971 || 1995 DJ || — || February 21, 1995 || Oizumi || T. Kobayashi || — || align=right | 4.5 km || 
|-id=972 bgcolor=#E9E9E9
| 30972 ||  || — || February 24, 1995 || Kitt Peak || Spacewatch || — || align=right | 3.2 km || 
|-id=973 bgcolor=#fefefe
| 30973 ||  || — || February 24, 1995 || Kitt Peak || Spacewatch || NYS || align=right | 2.0 km || 
|-id=974 bgcolor=#E9E9E9
| 30974 || 1995 EL || — || March 5, 1995 || Oizumi || T. Kobayashi || DOR || align=right | 9.6 km || 
|-id=975 bgcolor=#fefefe
| 30975 || 1995 EM || — || March 6, 1995 || Oizumi || T. Kobayashi || V || align=right | 3.1 km || 
|-id=976 bgcolor=#E9E9E9
| 30976 ||  || — || March 28, 1995 || Kushiro || S. Ueda, H. Kaneda || — || align=right | 6.7 km || 
|-id=977 bgcolor=#fefefe
| 30977 ||  || — || May 5, 1995 || Caussols || E. W. Elst || NYS || align=right | 3.4 km || 
|-id=978 bgcolor=#E9E9E9
| 30978 ||  || — || June 23, 1995 || Kitt Peak || Spacewatch || — || align=right | 4.8 km || 
|-id=979 bgcolor=#d6d6d6
| 30979 ||  || — || July 22, 1995 || Kitt Peak || Spacewatch || — || align=right | 8.0 km || 
|-id=980 bgcolor=#d6d6d6
| 30980 ||  || — || August 31, 1995 || Catalina Station || T. B. Spahr || Tj (2.97) || align=right | 14 km || 
|-id=981 bgcolor=#d6d6d6
| 30981 ||  || — || September 25, 1995 || Catalina Station || T. B. Spahr || ALA || align=right | 14 km || 
|-id=982 bgcolor=#d6d6d6
| 30982 ||  || — || September 21, 1995 || Xinglong || SCAP || THM || align=right | 11 km || 
|-id=983 bgcolor=#d6d6d6
| 30983 ||  || — || September 18, 1995 || Kitt Peak || Spacewatch || — || align=right | 6.9 km || 
|-id=984 bgcolor=#d6d6d6
| 30984 ||  || — || September 18, 1995 || Kitt Peak || Spacewatch || THM || align=right | 8.5 km || 
|-id=985 bgcolor=#d6d6d6
| 30985 ||  || — || September 19, 1995 || Kitt Peak || Spacewatch || THM || align=right | 6.4 km || 
|-id=986 bgcolor=#E9E9E9
| 30986 ||  || — || September 20, 1995 || Kitt Peak || Spacewatch || — || align=right | 9.8 km || 
|-id=987 bgcolor=#d6d6d6
| 30987 ||  || — || September 22, 1995 || Kitt Peak || Spacewatch || — || align=right | 5.6 km || 
|-id=988 bgcolor=#d6d6d6
| 30988 ||  || — || September 23, 1995 || Kitt Peak || Spacewatch || — || align=right | 3.7 km || 
|-id=989 bgcolor=#d6d6d6
| 30989 ||  || — || September 25, 1995 || Kitt Peak || Spacewatch || — || align=right | 12 km || 
|-id=990 bgcolor=#d6d6d6
| 30990 ||  || — || September 26, 1995 || Kitt Peak || Spacewatch || — || align=right | 7.0 km || 
|-id=991 bgcolor=#d6d6d6
| 30991 Minenze ||  ||  || September 28, 1995 || Xinglong || SCAP || KOR || align=right | 4.5 km || 
|-id=992 bgcolor=#d6d6d6
| 30992 ||  || — || September 17, 1995 || Kitt Peak || Spacewatch || — || align=right | 5.8 km || 
|-id=993 bgcolor=#d6d6d6
| 30993 ||  || — || September 30, 1995 || Kitt Peak || Spacewatch || — || align=right | 8.0 km || 
|-id=994 bgcolor=#d6d6d6
| 30994 ||  || — || October 24, 1995 || Sudbury || D. di Cicco || — || align=right | 8.0 km || 
|-id=995 bgcolor=#d6d6d6
| 30995 ||  || — || October 20, 1995 || Oizumi || T. Kobayashi || ALA || align=right | 11 km || 
|-id=996 bgcolor=#d6d6d6
| 30996 ||  || — || October 20, 1995 || Oohira || T. Urata || — || align=right | 5.5 km || 
|-id=997 bgcolor=#FFC2E0
| 30997 ||  || — || October 26, 1995 || Kitt Peak || Spacewatch || APO +1km || align=right | 1.4 km || 
|-id=998 bgcolor=#d6d6d6
| 30998 ||  || — || October 17, 1995 || Kitt Peak || Spacewatch || VER || align=right | 6.6 km || 
|-id=999 bgcolor=#d6d6d6
| 30999 ||  || — || October 21, 1995 || Kitt Peak || Spacewatch || — || align=right | 3.8 km || 
|-id=000 bgcolor=#d6d6d6
| 31000 Rockchic || 1995 VV ||  || November 11, 1995 || Haleakala || AMOS || — || align=right | 7.9 km || 
|}

References

External links 
 Discovery Circumstances: Numbered Minor Planets (30001)–(35000) (IAU Minor Planet Center)

0030